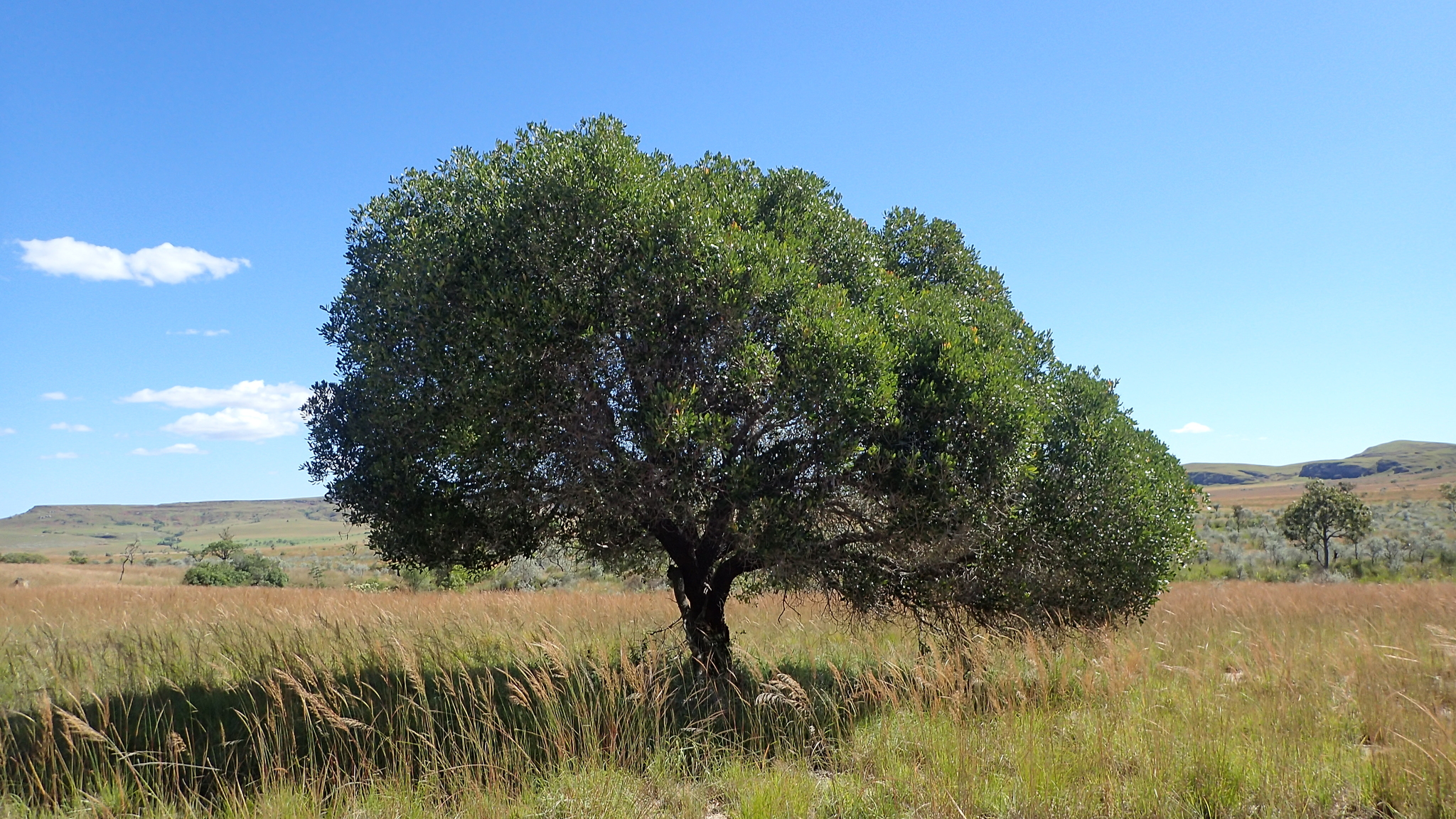

Conservation status
- Least Concern (IUCN 3.1)

Scientific classification
- Kingdom: Plantae
- Clade: Tracheophytes
- Clade: Angiosperms
- Clade: Eudicots
- Clade: Rosids
- Order: Malpighiales
- Family: Phyllanthaceae
- Genus: Uapaca
- Species: U. bojeri

Binomial name
- Uapaca bojeri Baill., 1874

Synonyms
- Uapaca clusiacea Baker

= Uapaca bojeri =

Species of tree

Uapaca bojeri, or tapia (Malagasy pronunciation: ta-pee), is a tree species endemic to Madagascar. A characteristic element of the Madagascan flora, it occurs in the central highlands, where it dominates a type of sclerophyllous forest or woodland. Tapia forest has a high ecological value due to the fauna, flora, and funga it harbours, and is of economic interest to the local population, e.g. for collection of tapia fruits, firewood, mushrooms or wild silkworms, and hunting. Local impact through fire and cutting is seen as a form of sustainable use however tapia woodlands are now found only in scattered, isolated stands totaling at most 132,255 ha. Native woody vegetation of the central highlands is increasingly replaced by grasslands, primarily due to increased fire frequency as areas are burned annually.

== Description ==
Tapia is a tree that can grow 10–12 metres (33–39 ft) high, but usually stays at 3–5 metres (9.8–16.4 ft). Leaves are alternate and sclerophyllous. The bark is thick and furrowed. The tree is monoecious; its flowers appear from March to September. Male flowers have five stamens and five tepals, and are clustered in dense balls with an involucre of 7–8 bracts. Female inflorescences are reduced to one flower with a trilocular ovary, surrounded by bracts. Fruits are drupes 2–3 centimetres (0.79–1.18 in) in diameter, green to yellow, and brown when ripe. They contain a sweet, sticky mesocarp and three seeds.

== Etymology ==
The common name "tapia" is pronounced ta-pee in Malagasy. The name might come from the word tapy, "to dry", as tapia trees grow on hot sunny slopes. Tapia fruits are known as voan'tapia.

The species epithet of the scientific name, "bojeri", refers to the type specimen's collector, Wenceslas Bojer.

== Distribution and habitat ==
Tapia is endemic to the central highlands of Madagascar, in the Madagascar subhumid forests ecoregion, at altitudes ranging from 500 to 1,800 metres (1,600 to 5,900 ft). The main areas of occurrence are the Imamo zone west of the capital Antananarivo, the Col des Tapia ("saddle of the tapia") between Antsirabe and Ambositra, the Itremo massif, and Isalo National Park. Within a broader sub-arid to sub-humid region, tapia woodland is found in drier, rain-shadow microclimates, mainly on acidic soil on sandstone, quartzite and schist.

== Ecology ==
In a vegetation type classified as "tapia forest" in the Atlas of the Vegetation of Madagascar, tapia is the dominant and character species. This forest has a 10–12 metres (33–39 ft) high canopy, with other trees including several Anacardiaceae, Asteraceae, Asteropeiaceae, Rubiaceae, and Sarcolaenaceae. Trees are pyrophytes with a thick, fire-resistant bark. The understory is composed of ericoid shrubs, grasses, and frequently lianas. Degraded tapia forest has a more open canopy and is less diverse, with Sarcolaena oblongifolia and Pentachlaena latifolia dominating alongside tapia.

A root-symbiotic tree, tapia forms both arbuscular mycorrhiza and ectomycorrhiza. Associated ectomycorrhizal fungi include the genera Afroboletus, Amanita, Boletus, Cantharellus, Gyroporus, Lactarius, Leccinum, Rubinoboletus, Russula, Scleroderma, Suillus, Tricholoma and Xerocomus. Among them are edible mushrooms such as the chanterelle species Cantharellus platyphyllus ssp. bojeriensis, only found under tapia.

Regeneration of tapia mainly occurs through resprouting after coppicing and through root sprouts, similar to miombo woodlands in Eastern Africa. Seeds have only limited ability for dispersal and dormancy.

== Uses ==
Tapia trees and the forests they form are used for several purposes by local communities. The edible fruits are collected once fallen, while a taboo (fady) prohibits plucking them directly from the tree. Fruits are not only consumed in local households but also marketed. The cocoons of the tapia silkworm Borocera cajani (in Malagasy landibe) are also collected and used for the production of silk, traditionally used for burial shrouds. This wild silk equally has a local market importance. Other uses include the collection of fuelwood, mushrooms, berries, edible insects, herbal medicines, and hunting (including two species of tenrec).

== Conservation ==
Tapia forest is valuable due to its endemic fauna and flora and its uses for local communities. Humans impact tapia forests mainly through collection of wood for fuel or timber, grazing, and fire. In 2019, tapia was assessed as "Least Concern" on the IUCN red list. The Atlas of the Vegetation of Madagascar estimated tapia forest loss at around 43% since the 1970s, but admits that tapia cover is likely overestimated with satellite imagery.

The geographer Christian A. Kull argues that human interventions in tapia forests, including fire-setting and removal of dead wood, actually favour the growth of tapia trees and the associated silkworms. Rather than "forest", he uses the term "woodland" or "wooded savannas", implying a more open-canopy vegetation type. He suggests that tapia woodland has changed little in extent over the last century, and considers human impact a landscape "transformation" and form of sustainable use rather than a "degradation". Local legislation and traditions often ban the cutting of tapia trees. As main threat to tapia woodlands he sees the invasion by exotic trees, namely Eucalyptus and pines (Pinus khasya and P. patula).

== Gallery ==
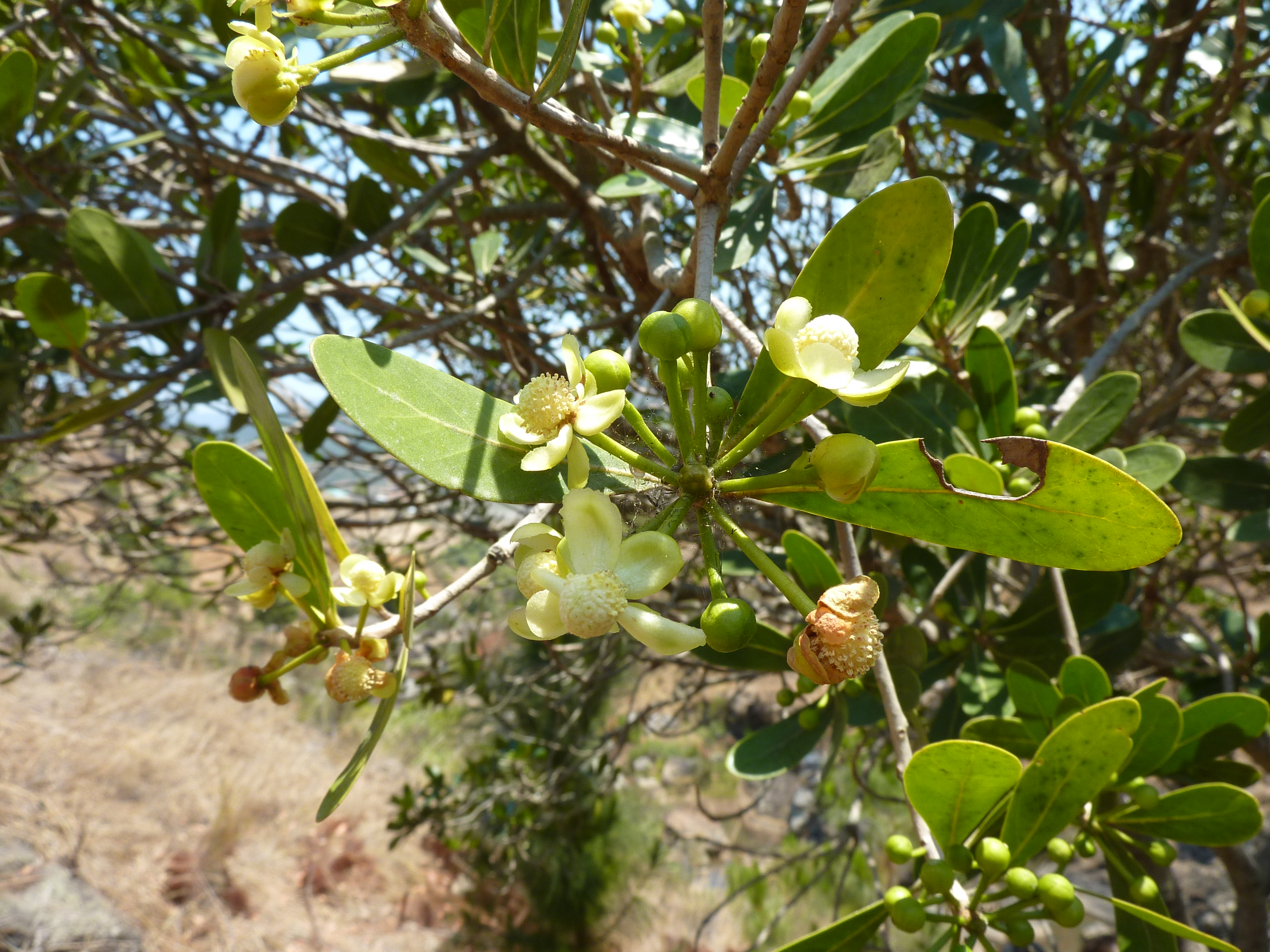
Leaves and flowers

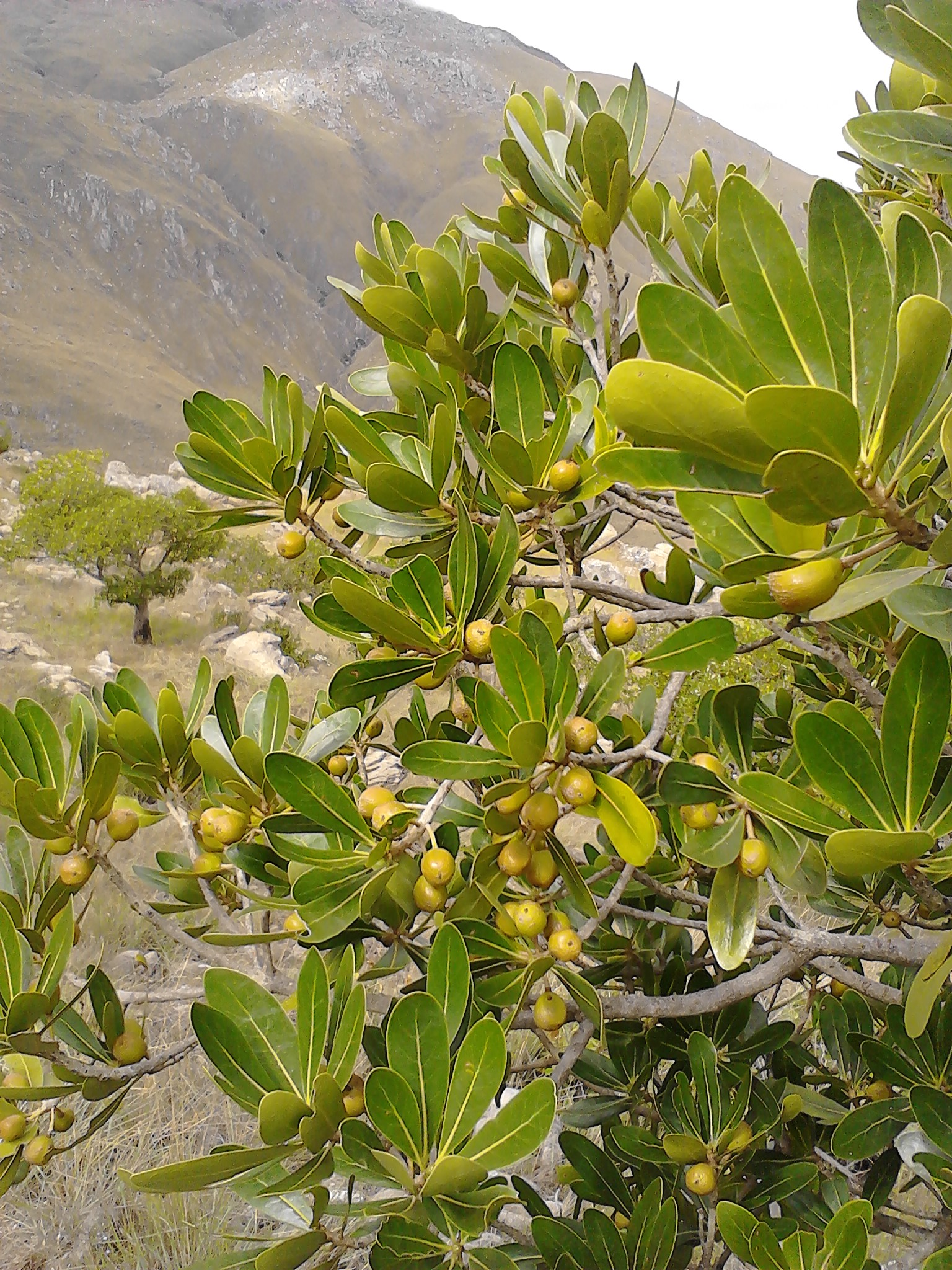
Fruits

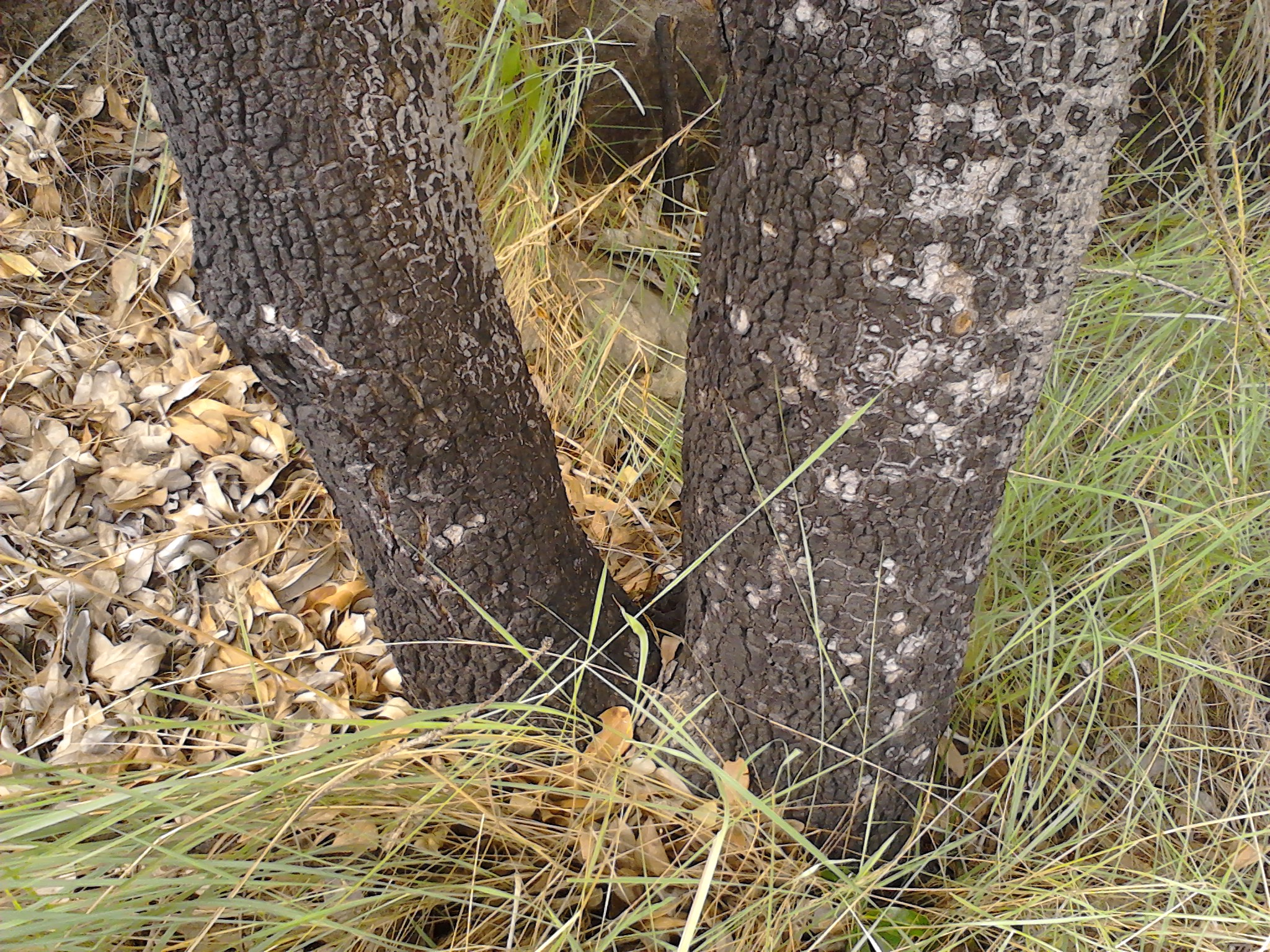
Bark blackened by fire

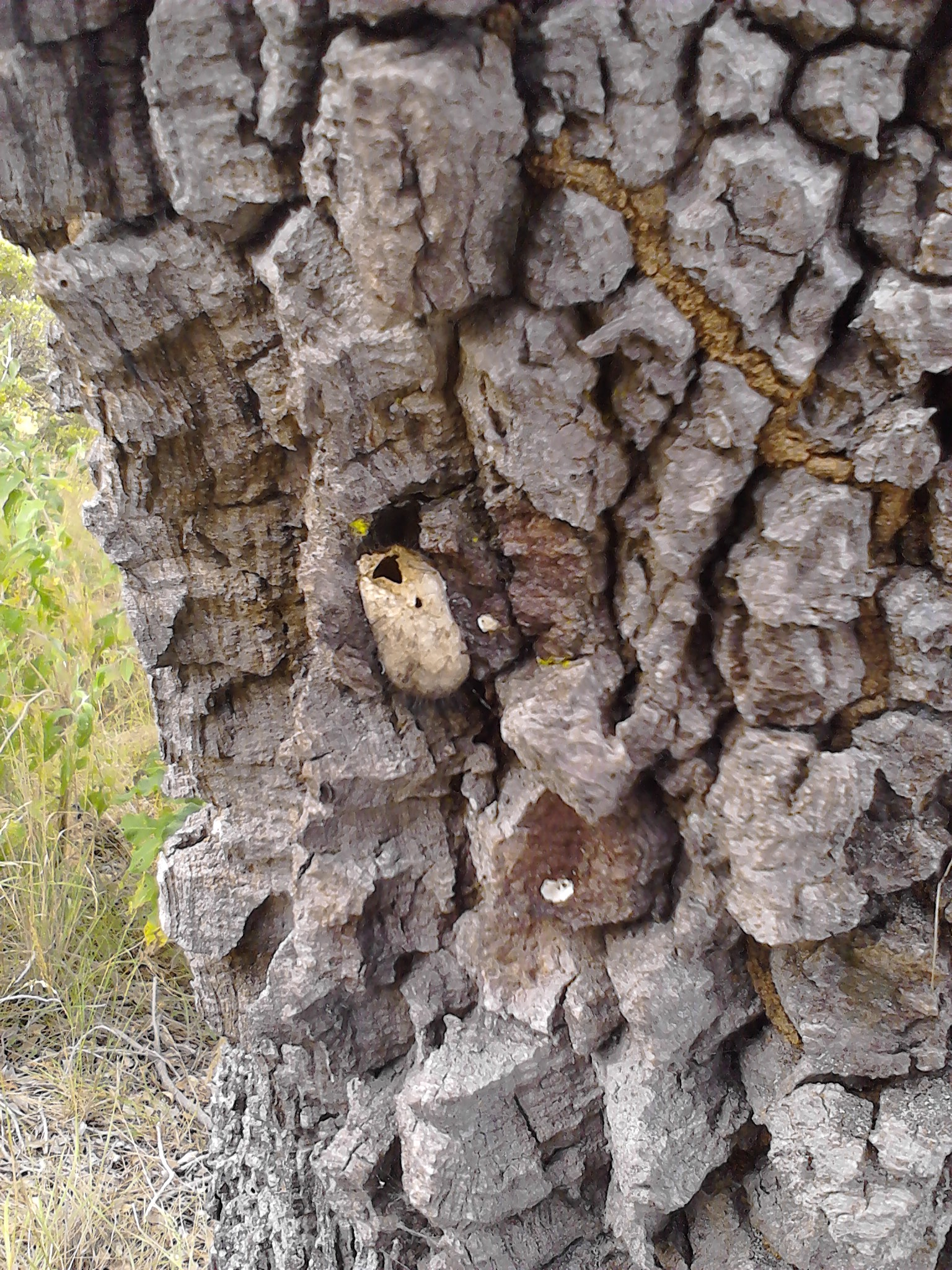
Empty cocoon of a tapia silkworm (Borocera madagascariensis)

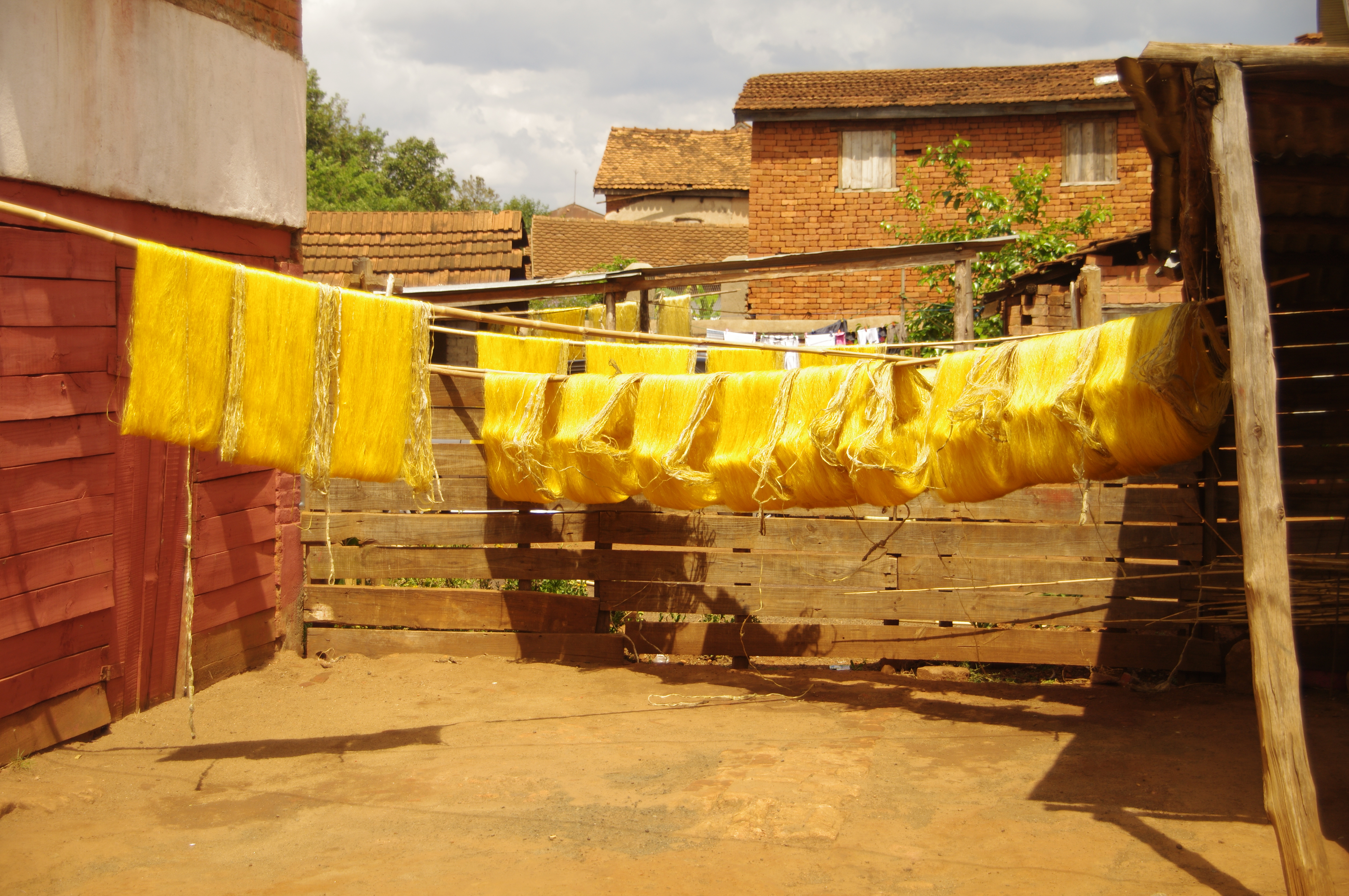
Tapia silk hung up for drying
