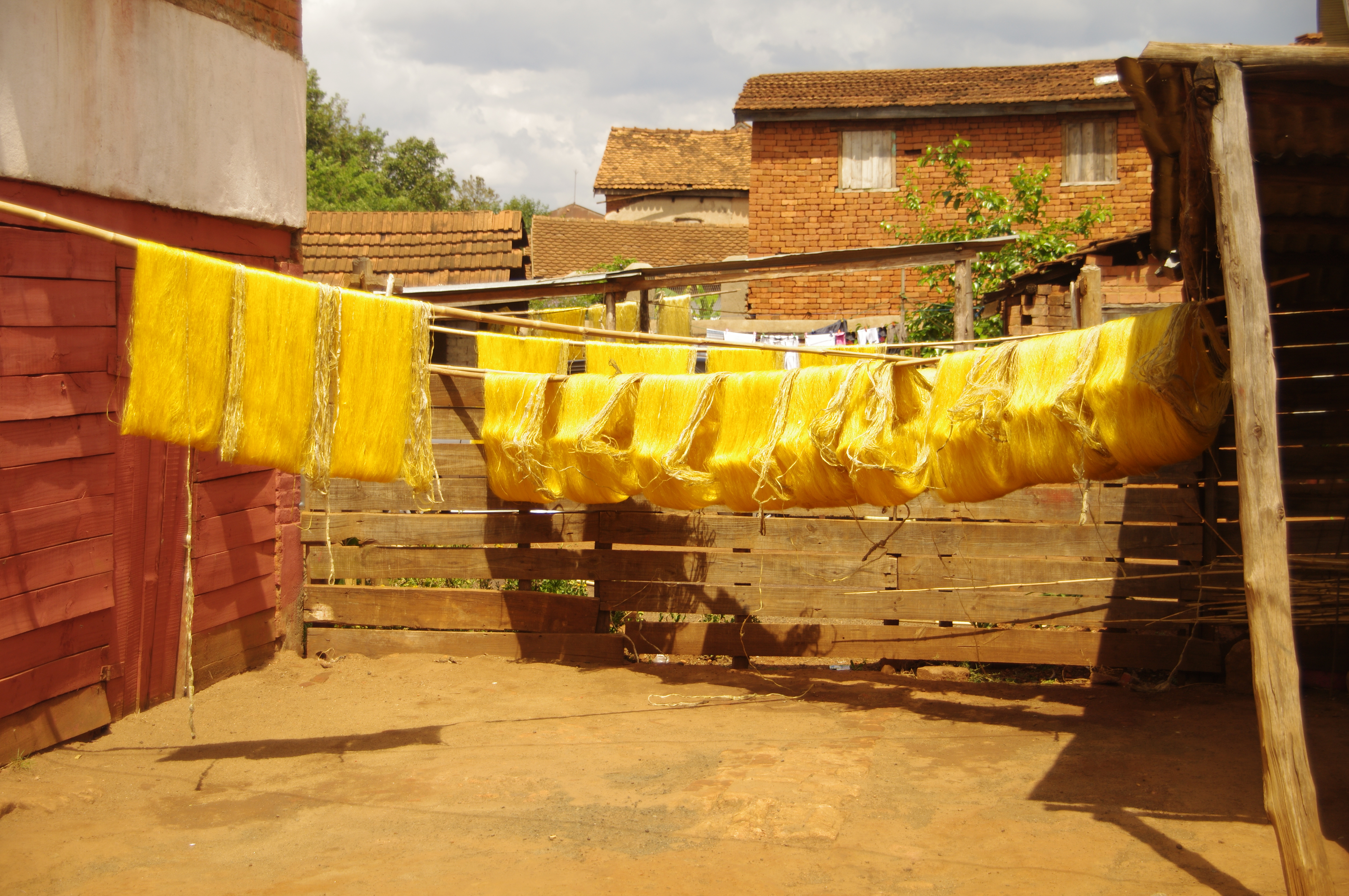
- Landibe silk being hung out to dry

Scientific classification
- Kingdom: Animalia
- Phylum: Arthropoda
- Class: Insecta
- Order: Lepidoptera
- Family: Lasiocampidae
- Genus: Borocera
- Species: B. cajani

Binomial name
- Borocera cajani Vinson, 1863

Synonyms
- Borocera signata (Aurivillius, 1927); Borocera striata (Conte, 1909); Lebeda cowani Butler, 1882; Borocera gigas (De Lajonquière, 1972); Borocera monsarrati (De Lajonquière, 1972); Libethra jejuna (Saalmüller, 1884); Borocera castanea (Aurivillius, 1927); Borocera cinerascens (Aurivillius, 1927); Libethra brunnea (Saalmüller, 1884); Borocera fuscescens (Mabille, 1879); Borocera cervina (Aurivillius, 1927); Borocera cowani (Butler, 1882); Borocera brunnea (Saalmüller, 1884); Borocera jejuna (Saalmüller, 1884)

= Borocera cajani =

Species of moth

Borocera cajani, also known as landibe in Malagasy, is a species of silk-producing lasiocampid moth endemic to Madagascar. It is often confused with the similar Borocera madagascariensis, which has the same Malagasy name. However, B. cajani is the species associated with silk production in highland Madagascar, while B. madagascariensis is found in the coastal portion of the island.

Landibe moths are distributed throughout the highland tapia forests of inland Madagascar, including the zones of Imamo and Itremo massif, Isalo National Park, and the Col des Tapia. It flies all year within the tapia forest.

B. cajani produces a form of wild silk which has been harvested by the indigenous Malagasy people of the Madagascar highlands for hundreds of years. Silk production and weaving take place in different communities. A local center for the production of landibe silk is the central Madagascar town of Sahatsiho Ambohimanjaka. Wild landibe silk is thicker than that of the common silkworm Bombyx mori.

== Life history ==
B. cajani is bivoltine, and its life history is synchronous with that of the related Europtera punctillata moth. There have been suggestions that the species is trivoltine, and lacks a pupal diapause phase. It has been observed to have asynchronous life cycles depending on the location, with the likely reason being that the Imamo region being slightly more warm and wet compared to the Itremo region.

The first generation of eggs is laid during November to January, and the second generation from March to April. Larvae are active from November to February, and March to June/July. Pupae are found in February to March, and July to November. There are five larval stages. Pupae of the second generation are more numerous than the first. The entire life cycle takes between 102 and 192 days to complete.

B. cajani feeds on the following plants: Uapaca bojeri, Aphloia theiformis, Erica baroniana, Psychotria retiphlebia, Aristida rufescens, Saccharum viguieri, Imperata cylindrica, Dodonaea madagascariensis, Schizolaena microphylla, Sarcolaena oblongifolia, and Loudetia madagascariensis. Of these host plants, Uapaca bojeri, the tapia tree, forms the overwhelming majority of B. cajani's food. However, it has been raised experimentally to prefer another tree, voafotsy (Aphloia theaeformis).

B. cajani is preyed upon by a large variety of birds, bats, reptiles, preying mantids, ants, and spiders. They are subject to parasitism by Ichneumonid and Braconid wasps, as well as the tachinid fly Synthesiomyia nudiseta. It is subject to diseases such as Pébrine, Muscardine, and Flacherie.

== Human interactions ==
=== As food ===
B. cajani is considered a delicacy to the Malagasy people. They eat it in the pupal stage either fried or mixed with chicken and rice. Only pupae are eaten, not the larvae. The Malagasy people call the larvae zana-dandy.

=== As a resource ===
The Malagasy people regularly harvest the cocoons of B. cajani, which they call soherina. Landibe silk is harvested by women, who dye the silks using plant dye, mud, and charcoal to give the silk earthy colors. An estimated 10,000 families work within the silk industry within Madagascar. Due to its rarity, landibe silk can sell for high prices, ranging from 100 to 200 American dollars for a few meters. During the colonial period, French authorities attempted to control the landibe industry, with a landibe research center being created by colonial authorities. Joseph Gallieni wrote of landibe silk as an "important issue which directly affects the economic future of Madagascar," with district boundaries planned out according to expected silk revenues within the tapia woodlands. It was later deemed of inferior quality to Bombyx mori silk, locally known as landilikely.

The Malagasy buried the deceased in shrouds of silk made from B. cajani cocoons, and they would regularly exhume bodies every 5–10 years to be rewrapped in landibe silk in a practice known as Famadihana or famonosan-drazana. Red-dyed Landibe shrouds are known as lambamena in the Malagasy language, while lighter shades of cloth are known as lambalandy which is wrapped over the initial lambamena layer. The practice of Famadihana is of importance, constituting a form of razana worship. Where beings in a parallel spiritual world constantly interact with the world of the living. The practice is one of simultaneously clothing the corpse, as well as honoring them. While refusing to shroud a corpse is viewed as stripping the body of its status as a human and veneration.

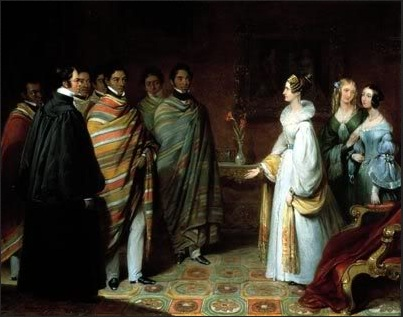
Embassy of Madagascar to Great Britain in reign of queen Ranavalona I, with robes of landibe silk. Painting by Henry Room, before 1850

Along with funerary shrouds, landibe silk is used to make lamba garments. The lamba is often seen as an iconic Malagasy symbol to the diaspora population, which wear it to represent their cultural heritage. During the rule of Radama I, landibe silk was used to create Western attire such as suits and in the present day, can be used to make high-end fashion. Some elder individuals hold the silk in high regard, and believe that only nobility and elders can wear it, due to its association with the practices of Famadihana.

== Conservation ==
B. cajani is currently unlisted on the IUCN Red List. However a local study noted that the species was "critically endangered" in its local habitat of tapia woodland. From a yield of 100 tons in 1902, landibe silk has fallen to a yield of 43 tons in 2009. Historically, the drop was attributed to zavadolo or spiritual matters, as well as the lack of soron-dandy, a ritual to ensure a large yield of silk.

An indirect threat to the silkworms have been bush fires caused by dahalo, bandits who burn the tapia woodland where the moths are native to cover their tracks during theft, along with deforestation for firewood.

== Gallery ==
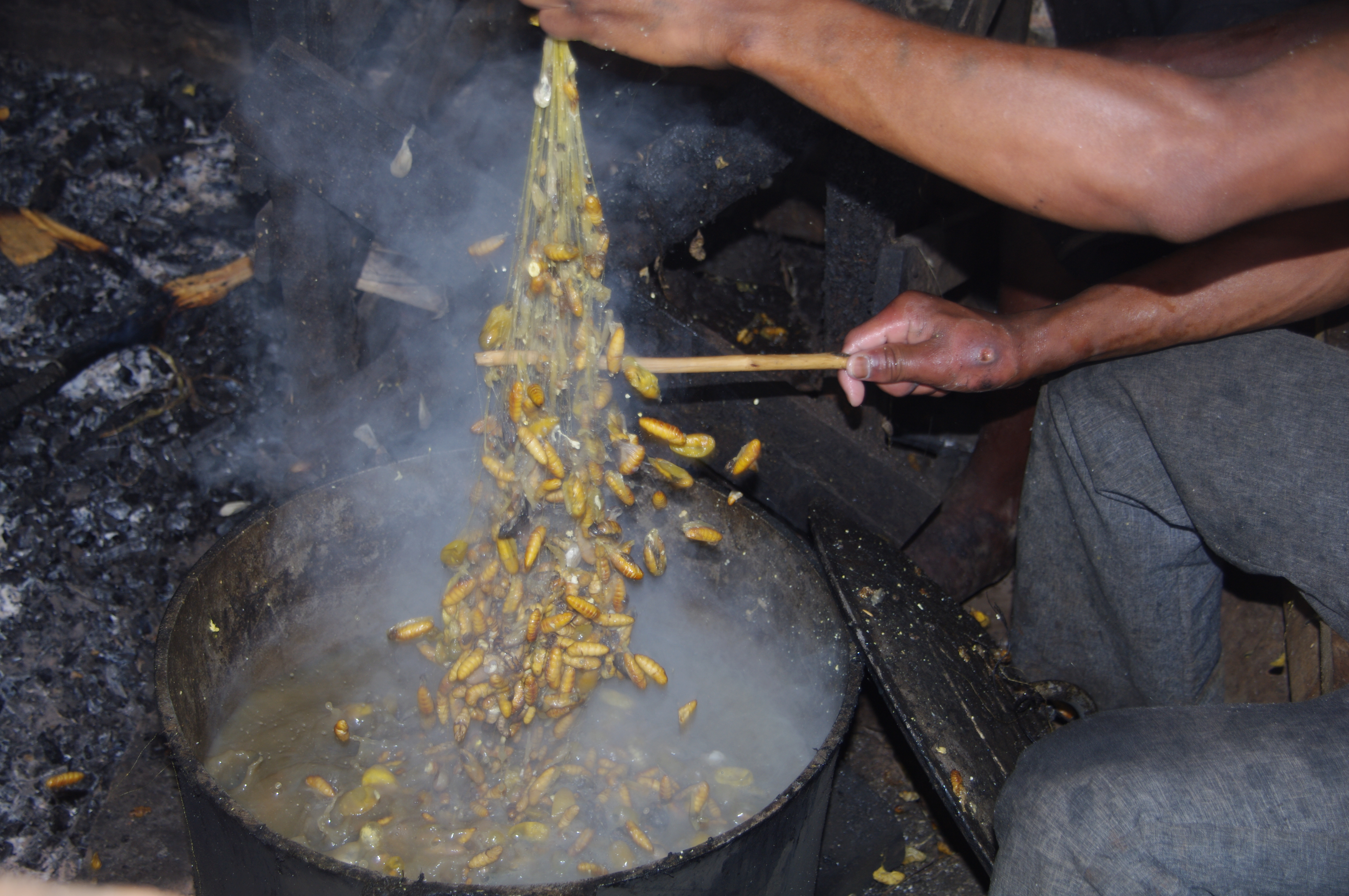
Boiling the soherina (pupae)

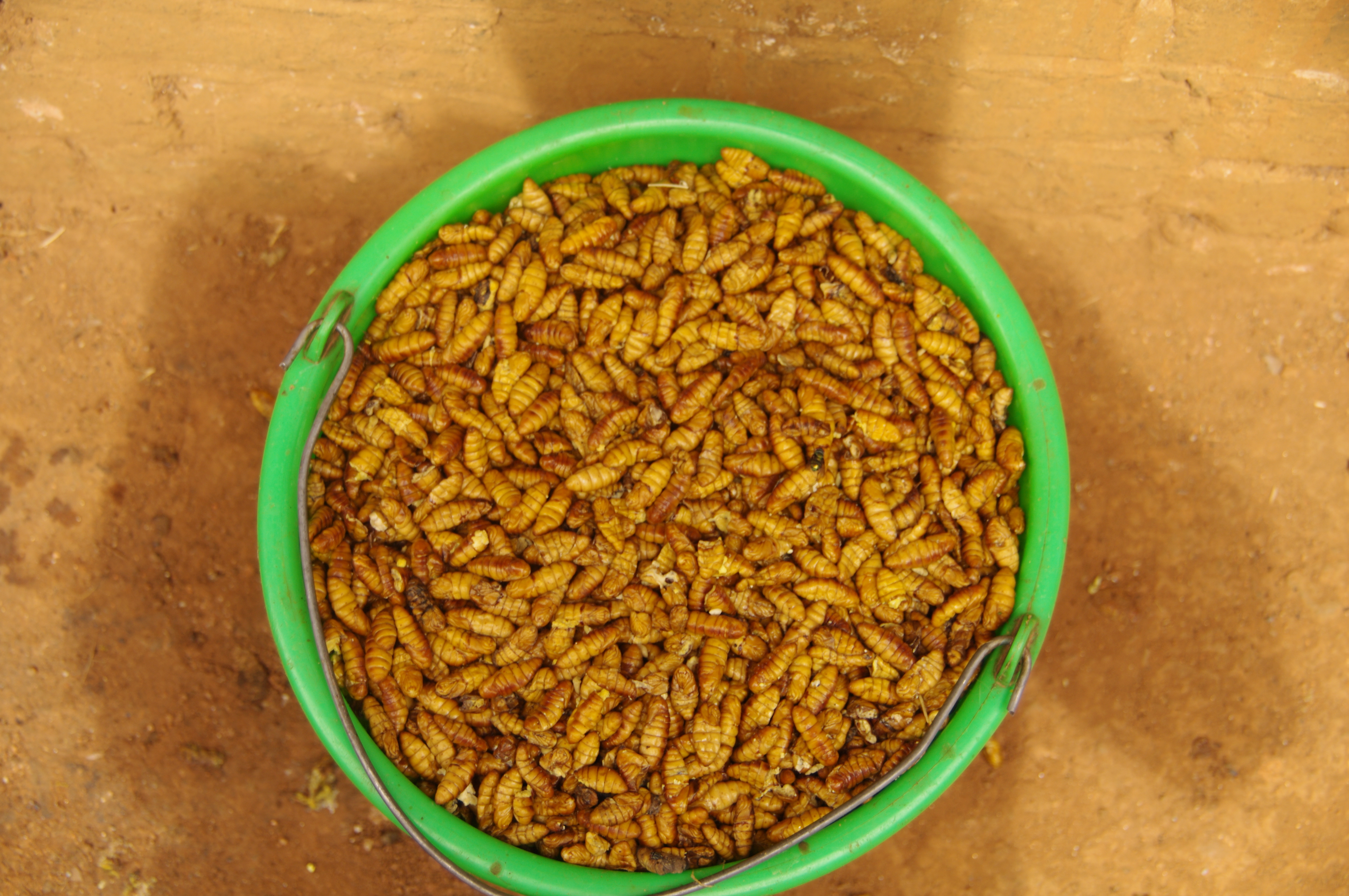
The extracted chrysalids

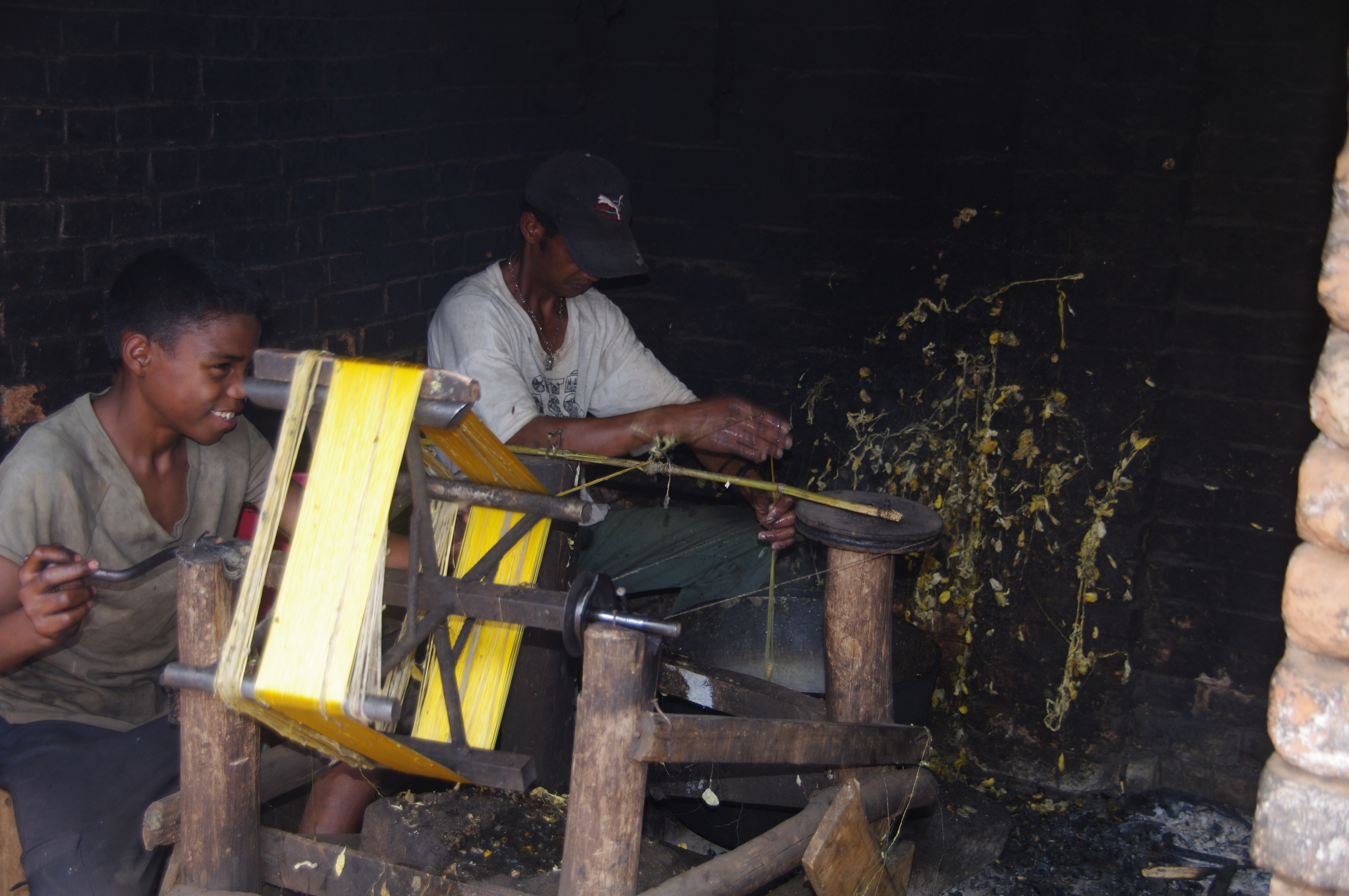
Manually processing the landibe thread

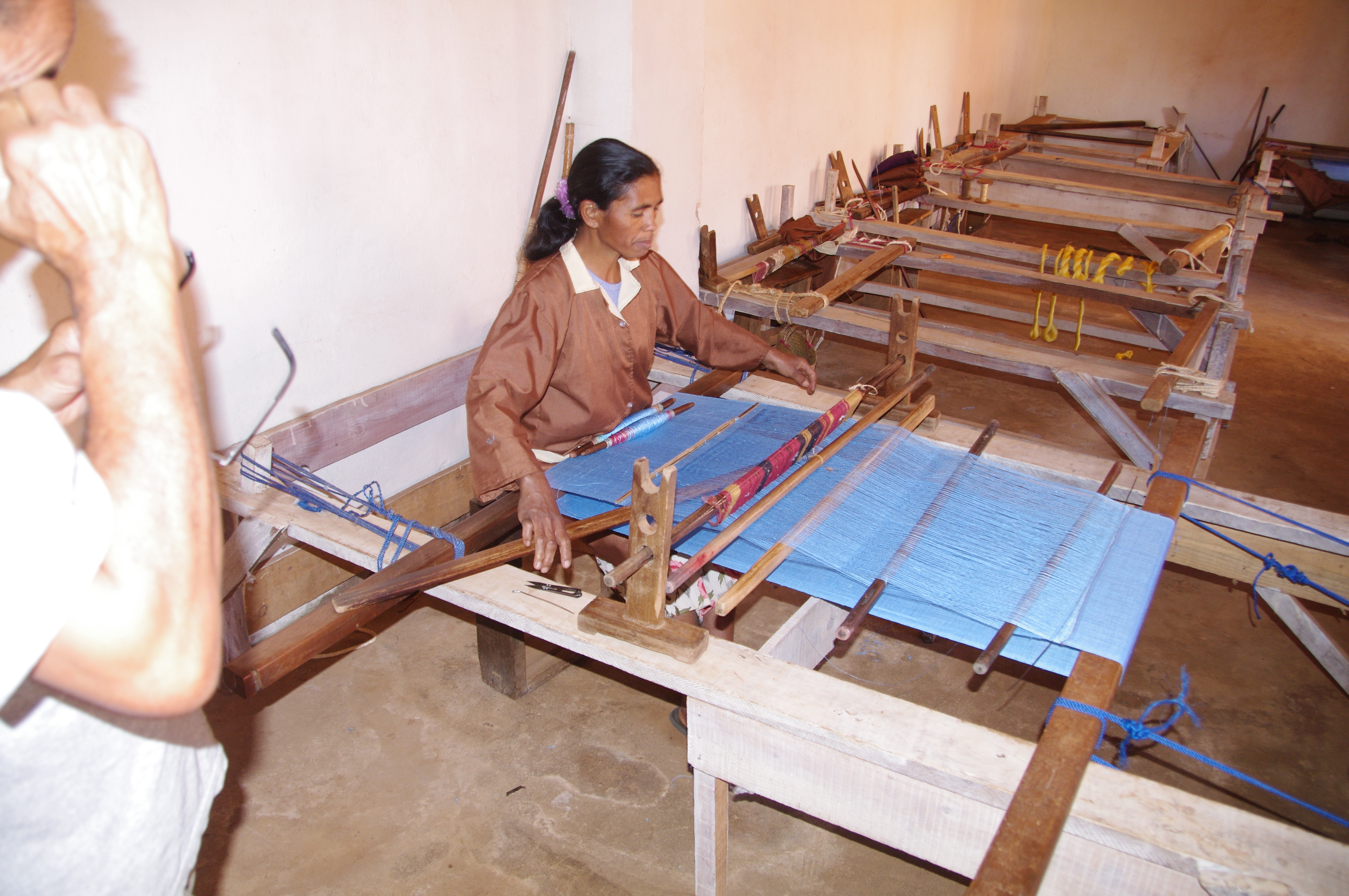
Hand weaving of the landibe silk
