= Flora of Madagascar =

Plants endemic to Madagascar

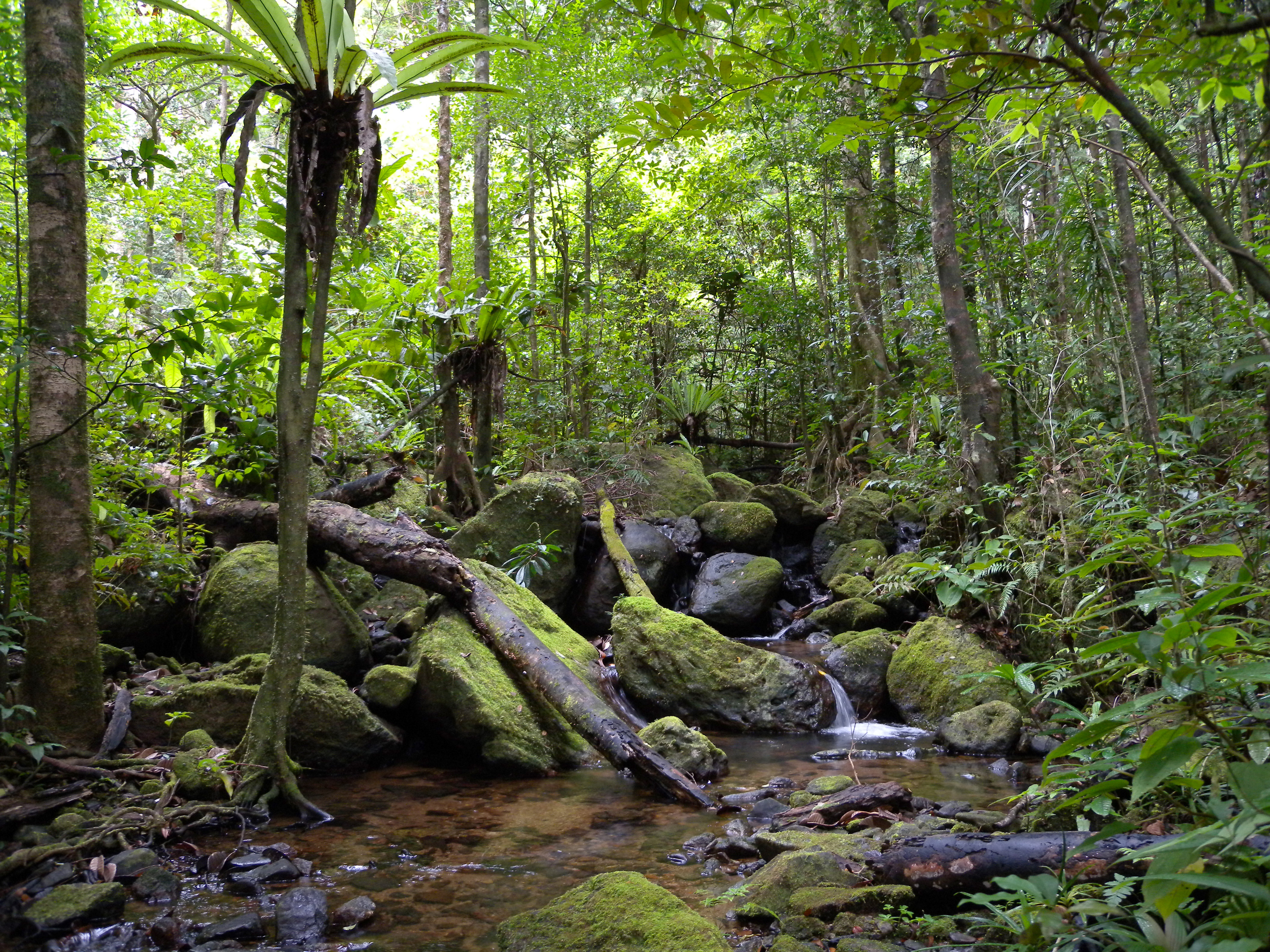
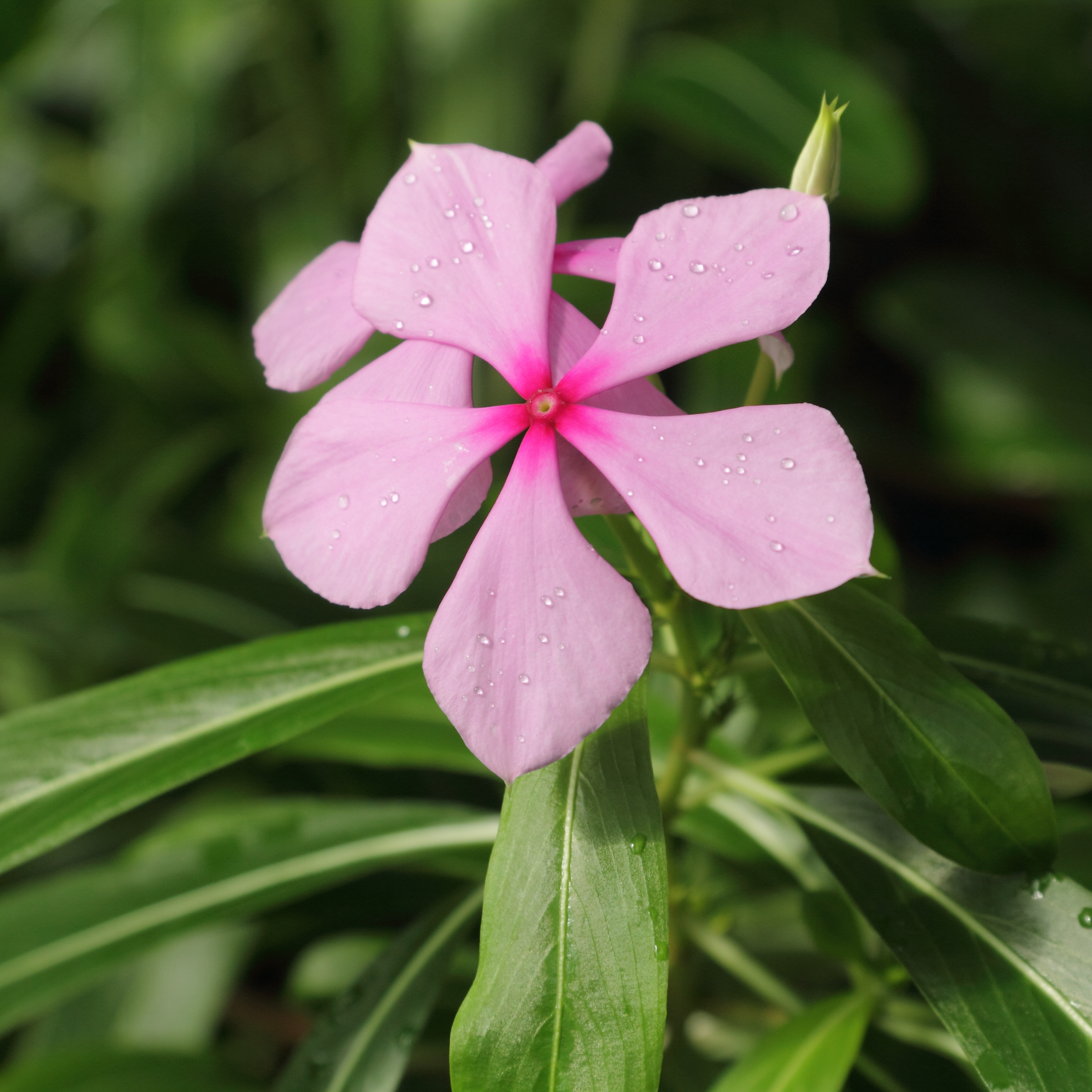
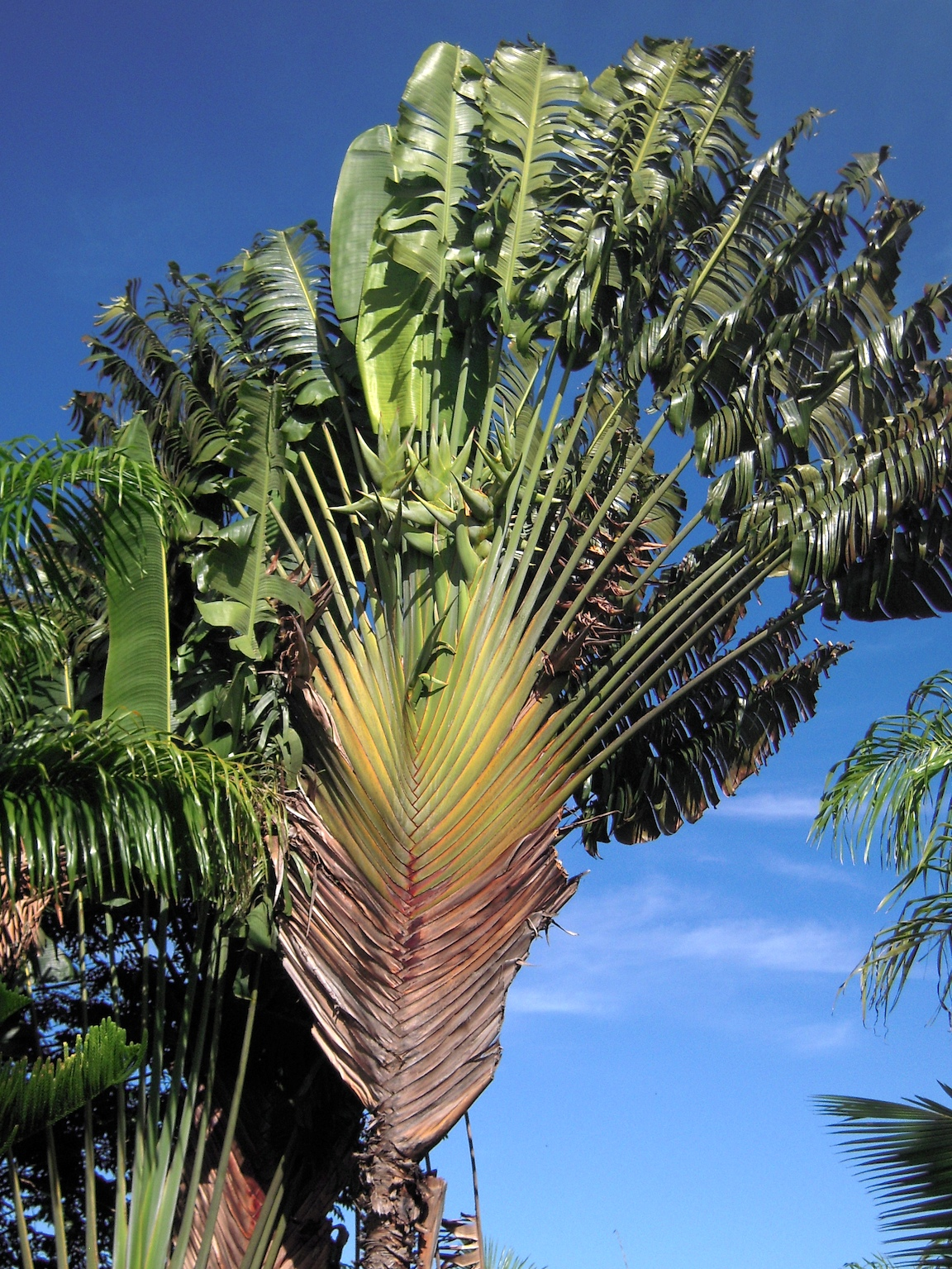
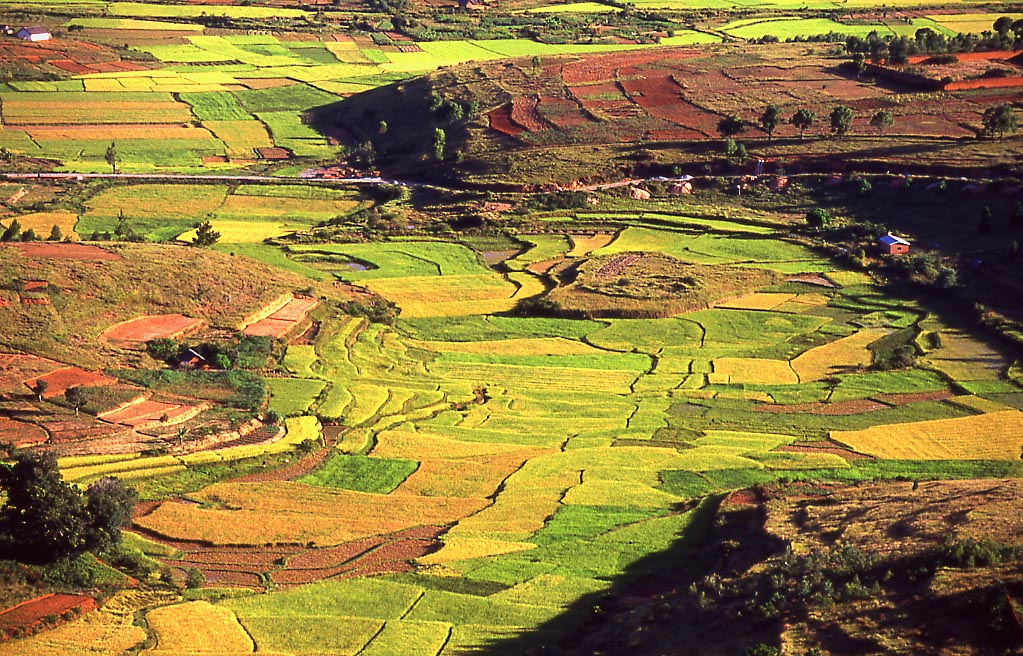
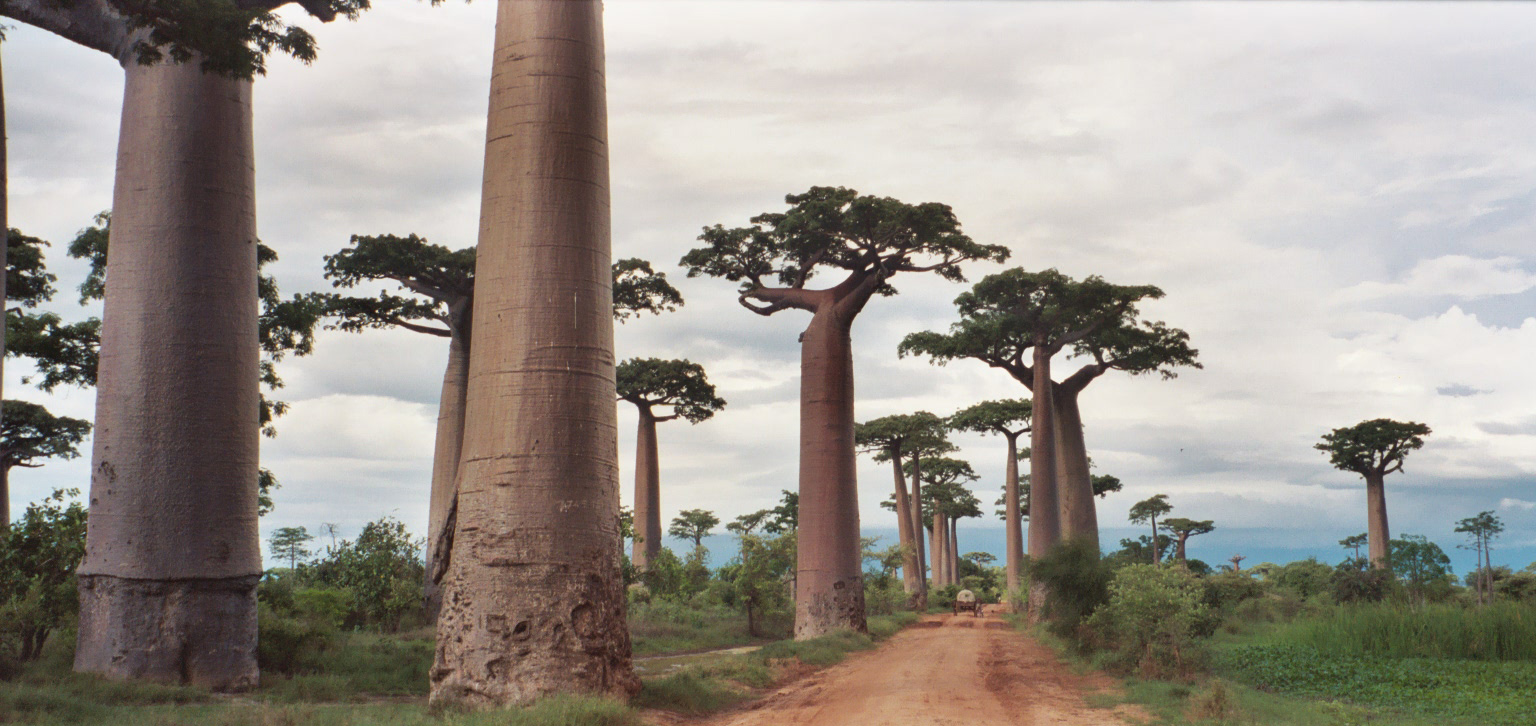
Clockwise from top left: rainforest in Masoala National Park; the Madagascar periwinkle; terraced rice fields in the central highlands; Avenue of Baobabs near Morondava; the endemic traveller's tree.

The flora of Madagascar consists of more than 12,000 species of plants, as well as a poorly known number of fungi and algae. Around 83% of Madagascar's vascular plants are found only on the island. These endemics include five plant families, 85% of the over 900 orchid species, around 200 species of palms, and such emblematic species as the traveller's tree, six species of baobab and the Madagascar periwinkle. The high degree of endemism is due to Madagascar's long isolation following its separation from the African and Indian landmasses in the Mesozoic, 150–160 and 84–91 million years ago, respectively. However, few plant lineages remain from the ancient Gondwanan flora; most extant plant groups immigrated via across-ocean dispersal well after continental break-up.

After its continental separation, Madagascar probably experienced a dry period, and tropical rainforest expanded only later in the Oligocene to Miocene when rainfall increased. Today, humid forests, including the lowland forests, are mainly found on the eastern plateau where abundant rainfall from the Indian Ocean is captured by an escarpment. A large part of the central highlands, in the sub-humid forests ecoregion, is today dominated by grasslands. They are widely seen as result of human landscape transformation but some may be more ancient. Grassland occurs in a mosaic with woodland and bushland, including tapia forest, and hard-leaved thickets on the high mountains. Dry forest and succulent woodland are found in the drier western part and grade into the unique spiny thicket in the southwest, where rainfall is lowest and the wet season shortest. Mangroves occur on the west coast, and a variety of wetland habitats with an adapted flora are found across the island.

The first human presence in Madagascar dates only 2000–4000 years back, and settlement in the interior occurred centuries later. The Malagasy people have used the native flora for various purposes, including food, construction, and medicine. Exotic plants were introduced by early settlers, later traders and French colonialists, and many have become important to agriculture. Among them are rice, the staple dish of Malagasy cuisine grown in terraced fields in the highlands, and greater yam, taro, cowpea, and plantain. Plantation crops include litchi, cloves, coffee, and vanilla, the latter one of the country's main export produce today. More than 1,300 introduced plants are known, of which around 600 have become naturalised, and some invasive.

Human population growth and economic activity have put pressure on natural vegetation in the region, especially through massive deforestation. Madagascar's high endemism and species richness coupled with a sharp decrease in primary vegetation make the island a global biodiversity hotspot. To preserve natural habitats, around 10% of the land surface is protected, including the World Heritage sites Tsingy de Bemaraha and the Rainforests of the Atsinanana. While historically mainly European naturalists described Madagascar's flora scientifically, today a number of national and international herbaria, botanical gardens and universities document plant diversity and engage in its conservation.

== Diversity and endemism ==
Madagascar has been described as "one of the most floristically unique places in the world". As of 2018, 343 families of vascular plants and bryophytes, with roughly 12,000 species, were known according to the Catalogue of the plants of Madagascar. Many plant groups are still insufficiently known. Madagascar is the island with the second-highest number of vascular plants, behind New Guinea. Of the vascular plants, 83% are endemic: they are found only in Madagascar. These endemics include five entire plant families: Asteropeiaceae, Barbeuiaceae, Physenaceae, Sarcolaenaceae and Sphaerosepalaceae. As many as 96% of Madagascan trees and shrubs are estimated to be endemic.

=== Vascular plants ===
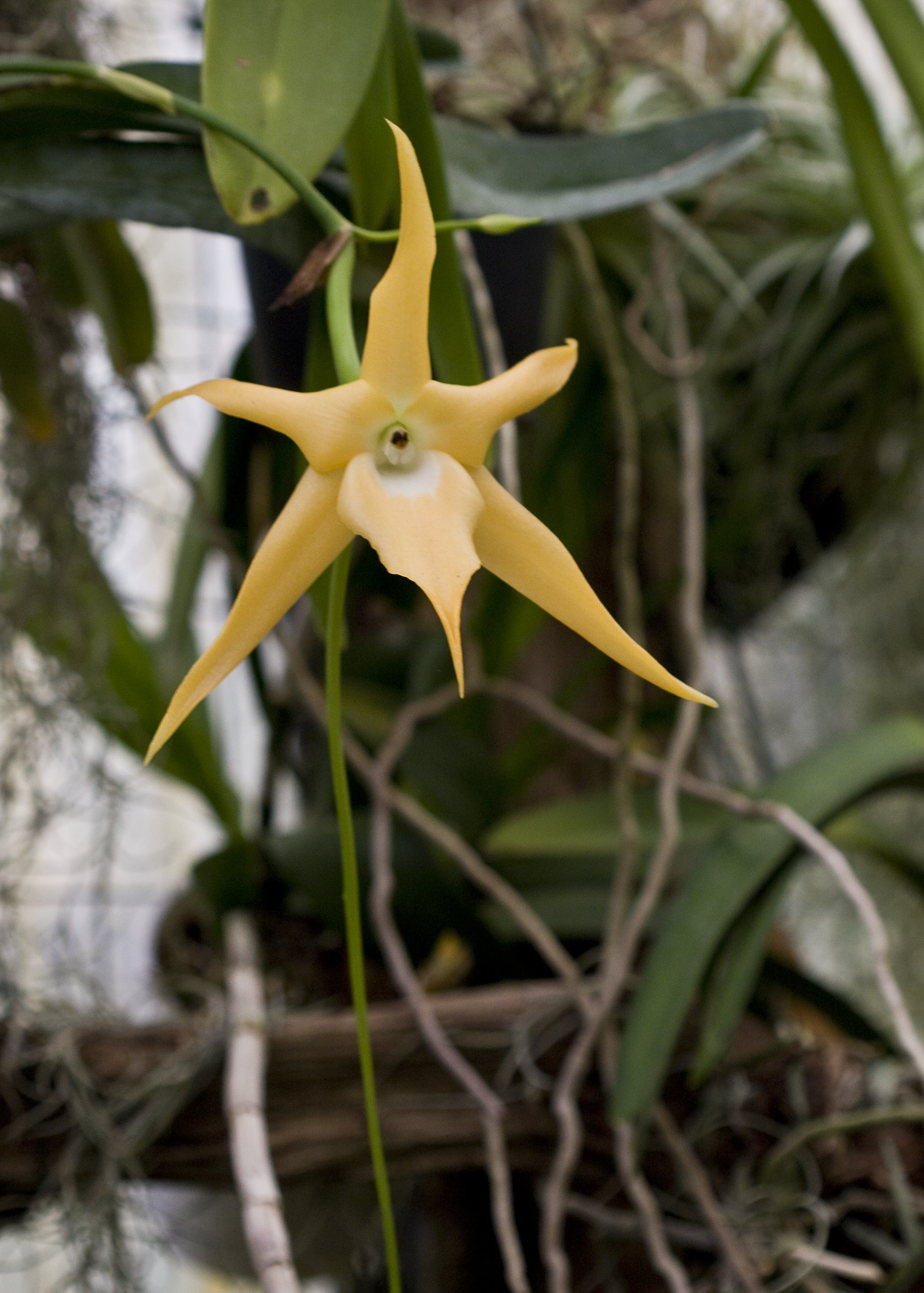
Angraecum sesquipedale (Darwin's orchid), one of over 900 orchids in Madagascar

Among the non-flowering plants, ferns, lycophytes and allies count roughly 570 described species in Madagascar. About half of these are endemic; in the scaly tree fern family Cyatheaceae, native to the humid forests, all but three of 47 species are endemic. Six conifers in genus Podocarpus – all endemic – and one cycad (Cycas thouarsii), are native to the island.

In the flowering plants, basal groups and magnoliids account for some 320 Madagascan species, around 94% of which are endemic. The families most rich in species are Annonaceae, Lauraceae, Monimiaceae, and Myristicaceae, containing mainly trees, shrubs, and lianas, and the predominantly herbaceous pepper family (Piperaceae).

Monocots are highly diversified. They include Madagascar's most species-rich plant family, the orchids (Orchidaceae), with over 900 species of which 85% are endemic. Palms (Arecaceae) have around 200 species in Madagascar (most in the large genus Dypsis), more than three times as many as in continental Africa; all but five are endemic. Palm genera that are endemic to Madagascar are Beccariophoenix, Bismarckia, Dypsis, Lemurophoenix, Marojejya, Masoala, Ravenea, Satranala, Tahina, and Voanioala.

Other large monocot families include the Pandanaceae with 88 endemic pandan (Pandanus) species, mainly found in humid to wet habitats, and the Asphodelaceae, with most species and over 130 endemics in the succulent genus Aloe. Grasses (Poaceae, around 550 species) and sedges (Cyperaceae, around 300) are species-rich, but have lower levels of endemism (40% and 37%, respectively). The endemic traveller's tree (Ravenala madagascariensis), a national emblem and widely planted, is the sole Madagascan species in the family Strelitziaceae.

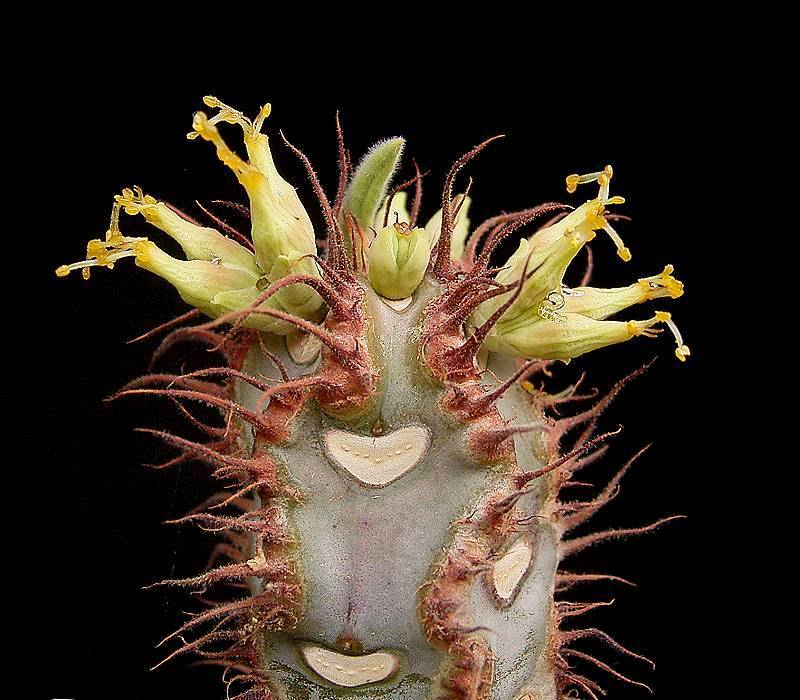
Euphorbia iharanae, an endemic succulent from the north of Madagascar

The eudicots account for most of Madagascar's plant diversity. Their most species-rich families on the island are:

- Fabaceae (legumes, 662 species – 77% endemic), accounting for many trees in humid and dry forests, including rosewood;
- Rubiaceae (coffee family, 632 – 92%), with notably over 100 endemic Psychotria and 60 endemic Coffea species;
- Asteraceae (composite family, 535 – 81%), with over 100 endemic species in Helichrysum;
- Acanthaceae (acanthus family, 500 – 94%), with 90 endemic species in Hypoestes;
- Euphorbiaceae (spurge family, 459 – 94%), notably the large genera Croton and Euphorbia;
- Malvaceae (mallows, 486 – 87%), including the large genus Dombeya (177 – 97%) and seven out of nine baobabs (Adansonia), of which six are endemic;
- Apocynaceae (dogbane family, 363 – 93%), including the Madagascar periwinkle (Catharanthus roseus);
- Melastomataceae (melastomes, 341 – 98%), mainly trees and shrubs.

=== Non-vascular plants ===
A checklist from 2012 records 751 moss species and infraspecific taxa, 390 liverworts, and three hornworts. About 34% of the mosses and 19% of the liverworts are endemic. It is unknown how many of these species may have gone extinct since their discovery, and a number likely remain to be described.

=== Fungi ===
Many undescribed species of fungi are suspected in Madagascar. A number of edible mushrooms are consumed in the country, especially from the genera Auricularia, Lepiota, Cantharellus (the chanterelles), and Russula (the brittlegills). Most of the ectomycorrhizal species are found in plantations of introduced eucalyptus and pine, but also in native tapia (Uapaca bojeri) woodlands. The chytrid fungus Batrachochytrium dendrobatidis, responsible for chytridiomycosis, an infectious disease threatening amphibian populations worldwide, was long considered absent from Madagascar. In 2010 it was recorded, however, and has been confirmed since in various areas and in numerous frog families, alerting scientists to a new threat to the island's already endangered frog fauna.

Over 500 species of lichens of Madagascar have been documented, but the true number was estimated to be at least twice as high. Wet tropical areas of siliceous bedrock make up approximately two-thirds of the country, and are where most of the lichens have been found. Dry tropical areas of granitic and limestone bedrock make up the other one-third of the country with just over 20 species documented in these habitats.

=== Algae ===
Algae, a diverse group of non-plant photosynthetic organisms, are in general poorly known in Madagascar. A review of freshwater diatoms listed 134 species; most of them have been described from fossil deposits and it is unknown if they have become extinct. It is assumed that Madagascar harbours a rich endemic diatom flora. Diatom deposits from lake sediments have been used to reconstruct paleoclimatic variations on the island.

== Vegetation types ==
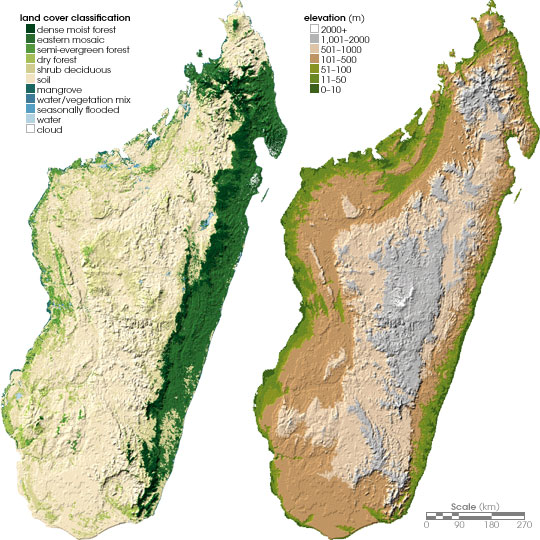
Two maps of Madagascar, showing land cover on the left and topography on the right

Land cover according to the Atlas of the vegetation of Madagascar (2007)
1. Plateau grassland–wooded grassland mosaic (41.7%)
2. Wooded grassland–bushland mosaic (22.9%)
3. Humid forest (8.06%)
4. Degraded humid forest (9.81%)
5. Western dry forest (5.40%)
6. South western dry spiny forest-thicket (3.10%)
7. Cultivation (likely underestimated) (3.97%)
8. Other (5.06%)

Madagascar features contrasting and unique vegetation types, determined mainly by topography, climate, and geology. A steep eastern escarpment captures most of the rainfall brought by trade winds from the Indian Ocean. Consequently, the eastern belt harbours most of the humid forests, while the west has a drier vegetation. The rain shadow region in the southwest has a sub-arid climate. The central highlands, above 800 m (2,600 ft), feature some high mountains, though the Tsaratanana Massif in the north has the highest elevation, namely 2,876 m (9,436 ft). Temperatures are highest on the west coast, with annual means of up to 30 °C (86 °F), while the high massifs have a cool climate with a 5 °C (41 °F) annual mean. The geology of Madagascar features mainly igneous and metamorphic basement rocks, with some lava and quartzite in the central and eastern plateaus, while the western part has belts of sandstone, limestone (including the tsingy formations), and unconsolidated sand.

The marked east–central–west distinction among Madagascan flora was already described by the English naturalist Richard Baron in 1889. Twentieth-century authors, including Henri Perrier de la Bâthie and Henri Humbert, built upon this concept and proposed several similar classification systems, based on floristic and structural criteria. A classification from 2007, the Atlas of the vegetation of Madagascar, distinguishes 15 vegetation types (including two degraded types and cultivation) based on satellite imagery and ground surveys; they are defined mainly based on vegetation structure and differ in species composition in different parts of the island. They partly correspond to the seven terrestrial ecoregions defined by the World Wildlife Fund (WWF) in Madagascar.

=== Humid forests ===
Tropical rainforest was estimated to cover around 8% of the island in 2007, but used to encompass more than twice as much. The ecoregion ranges from sea level to 2,750 m (9,020 ft) elevation and is mainly found on the eastern plateaus, on basement rocks with lateritic soils. In the north, humid forest extends west to the Sambirano river basin and islands including Nosy Be. Annual rainfall is 1,500–2,400 mm (59–94 in) – up to 6,000 mm (240 in) in areas such as Masoala Peninsula – and the dry season is short or absent. The predominantly evergreen forest, up to 35 m high (115 ft), is composed of tree and understory species from various families such as Burseraceae, Ebenaceae, Fabaceae, and Myristicaceae; bamboos and lianas are frequent. Cyclones hit the east coast of Madagascar in some years and can destroy habitats. The WWF classifies the eastern belt of humid forest, below 800 m (2,600 ft) elevation, in the "lowland forests" ecoregion and the montane forests of the highlands in the "sub-humid forests" ecoregion.

Degraded humid forest (savoka in Malagasy) covers about ten percent of the island. It spans various states of degradation and is composed of forest remnants and planted or otherwise introduced species. It is primarily the result of slash-and-burn cultivation in primary forest. Some forest fragments still harbour a considerable amount of biodiversity.

Littoral forest, found in several isolated areas along the eastern coast, covers less than 1% of the land area, on mainly sandy sediments. Climate is humid, with 1,300–3,200 mm (51–126 in) annual rainfall. Littoral forest covers sandy soil forest, marsh forest, and grasslands. Its flora includes various tree families, lianas, and epiphytic orchids and ferns; in the marsh forests, pandans (Pandanus) and the traveller's tree (Ravenala madagascariensis) are common. It is part of the WWF's "lowland forests" ecoregion.

An isolated area of humid forest in the south west, on the eastern slope of the Analavelona massif, is classified as "Western humid forest" by the Atlas. It occurs on lavas and sand, at 700–1,300 m (2,300–4,300 ft) elevation. The forest is maintained through condensating moisture from ascending air. It is unprotected but the local population considers it sacred. The WWF includes it in the "sub-humid forests" ecoregion.

=== Dry forests and thicket ===
Dry forest, accounting for roughly 5% of the surface, is found in the west, from the northern tip of the island to the Mangoky river in the south. It ranges from sea level to 1,600 m (5,200 ft) in elevation. Climate is sub-humid to dry, with 600–1,500 mm (24–59 in) annual rainfall and a dry season of around six months. Geology is varied and can include limestone forming the eroded tsingy outcrops. Vegetation is diverse; it ranges from forest to bushland and includes trees of the Burseraceae, Fabaceae, Euphorbiaceae, and baobab species. The WWF classifies the northern part of this vegetation as "dry deciduous forest" ecoregion and the southern part, including the northernmost range of Didiereaceae, as "succulent woodlands" ecoregion.

"Western sub-humid forest" occurs inland in the southwest and covers less than 1% of the surface, mainly on sandstone, at 70–100 m (230–330 ft) elevation. Climate is sub-humid to sub-arid, with 600–1,200 mm (24–47 in) annual rainfall. The vegetation, up to 20 m tall (66 ft) with a closed canopy, includes diverse trees with many endemics such as baobabs (Adansonia), Givotia madagascariensis, and the palm Ravenea madagascariensis. Cutting, clearing and invasive species such as opuntias and agaves threaten this vegetation type. It is part of the WWF's "sub-humid forests" ecoregion.

The driest part of Madagascar in the southwest features the unique "spiny forests" ecoregion (WWF). They cover ca. 4% of its area, at an elevation below 300 m (980 ft), on limestone and sandstone bedrocks. Mean annual rainfall is very low and concentrated in one month or less. It is a dense thicket composed of plants adapted to dry conditions, notably through succulent stems or leaves transformed into spines. The characteristic plants are the endemic subfamily Didiereoideae, baobabs, and Euphorbia species. A more open coastal bushland within the region is classified separately by the Atlas. Degraded spiny forest accounts for c. 1% of the surface and is the result of cutting, clearing, and encroachment. Introduced species such as agaves and opuntias are found with remnants of the native flora.

=== Grassland, woodland, and bushland ===
Grasslands dominate a large part of Madagascar, more than 75% according to some authors. Mainly found on the central and western plateaus, they are dominated by C_{4} grasses such as the common Aristida rufescens and Loudetia simplex and burn regularly. While many authors interpret them as the result of human degradation through tree-felling, cattle raising and intentional burning, it has been suggested that at least some of the grasslands may be primary vegetation. Grassland is often found in a mixture with trees or shrubs, including exotic pine, eucalypt, and cypress.

The Atlas distinguishes a "wooded grassland–bushland mosaic" covering 23% of the surface and a "plateau grassland–wooded grassland mosaic" covering 42%. Both occur on various substrates and account for most of the WWF's "sub-humid forests" ecoregion. At higher altitudes on thin soil, they grade into an indigenous, hard-leaved vegetation that includes Asteraceae, Ericaceae, Lauraceae, and Podocarpaceae shrubs, among others, and is singled out by the WWF as "ericoid thickets" ecoregion.

An evergreen open forest or woodland type, tapia forest, is found on the western and central plateaus, at altitudes of 500–1,800 m (1,600–5,900 ft). It is dominated by the eponymous tapia tree (Uapaca bojeri) and covers less than 1% of the surface. The broad regional climate is sub-humid to sub-arid, but tapia forest is mainly found in drier microclimates. Trees other than tapia include the endemic Asteropeiaceae and Sarcolaenaceae, with a herbaceous understory. Tapia forest is subject to human pressure, but relatively well adapted to fire. It falls in the WWF's "sub-humid forests" ecoregion.

=== Wetlands ===
Marshes, swamp forests and lakes are found in all regions, along with rivers and streams. Typical species of wet habitats include several endemic Cyperus sedges, ferns, pandans (Pandanus), and the traveller's tree. Two species of water lilies (Nymphaea lotus and N. nouchali) are found in the west and east, respectively. Lagoons are mainly found on the east coast, but also occur in the west; they have a specialised halophyte flora. Peat bogs are restricted to highlands above 2,000 m (6,600 ft) elevation; their distinct vegetation includes, among others, Sphagnum moss and sundew species (Drosera). Many wetlands have been converted into rice paddies and are otherwise threatened by destruction and pollution.

Mangroves occur on the western, Mozambique Channel coast, from the very north to just south of the Mangoky river delta. Eleven mangrove tree species are known from Madagascar, of which the most frequent belong to the families Acanthaceae, Lecythidaceae, Lythraceae, Combretaceae, and Rhizophoraceae. Mangrove forests are threatened by encroachment and cutting. The WWF lists the mangroves of Madagascar as separate ecoregion.

Examples of native vegetation in Madagascar

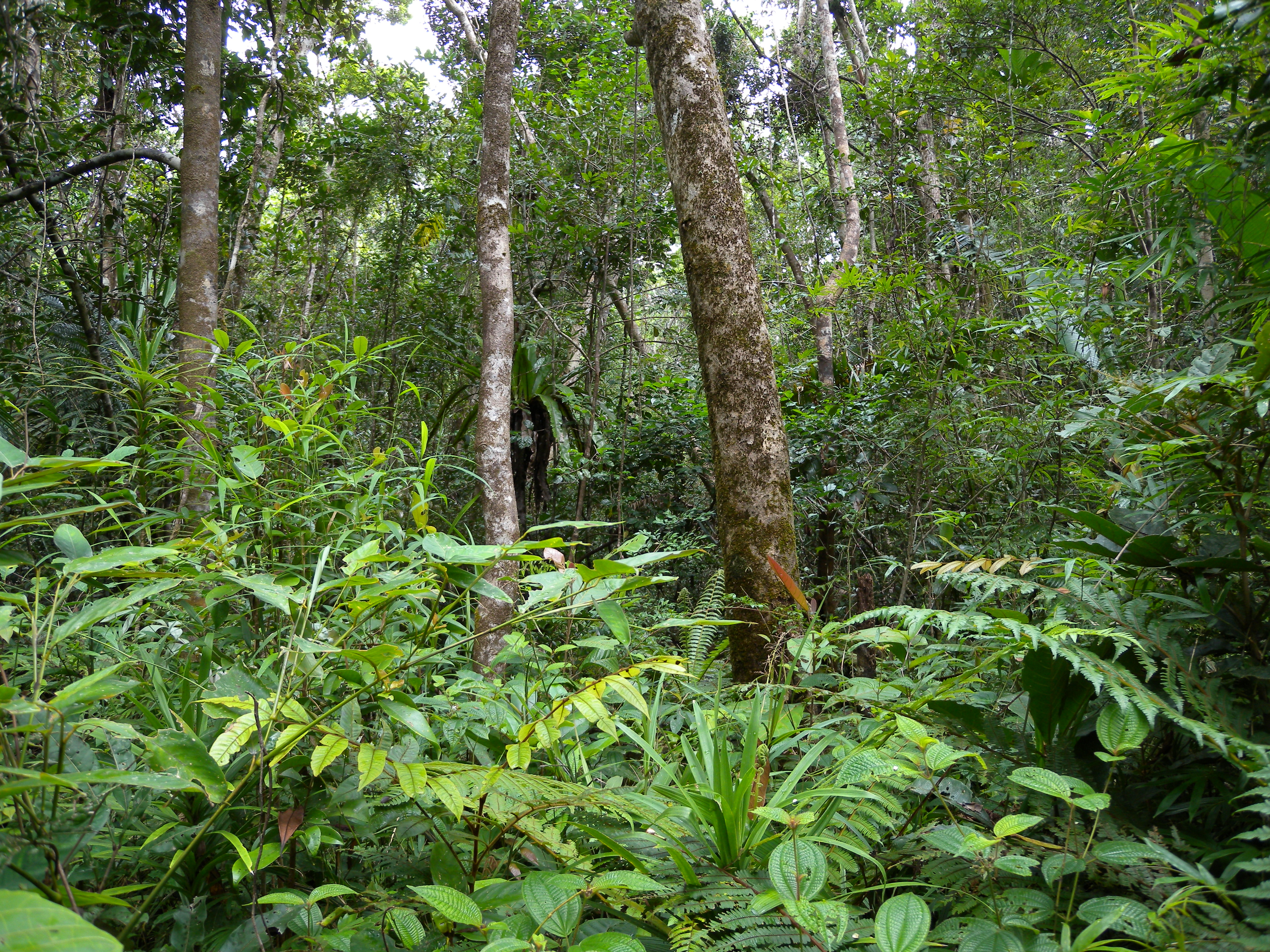
Humid forest remnant, Île Sainte Marie

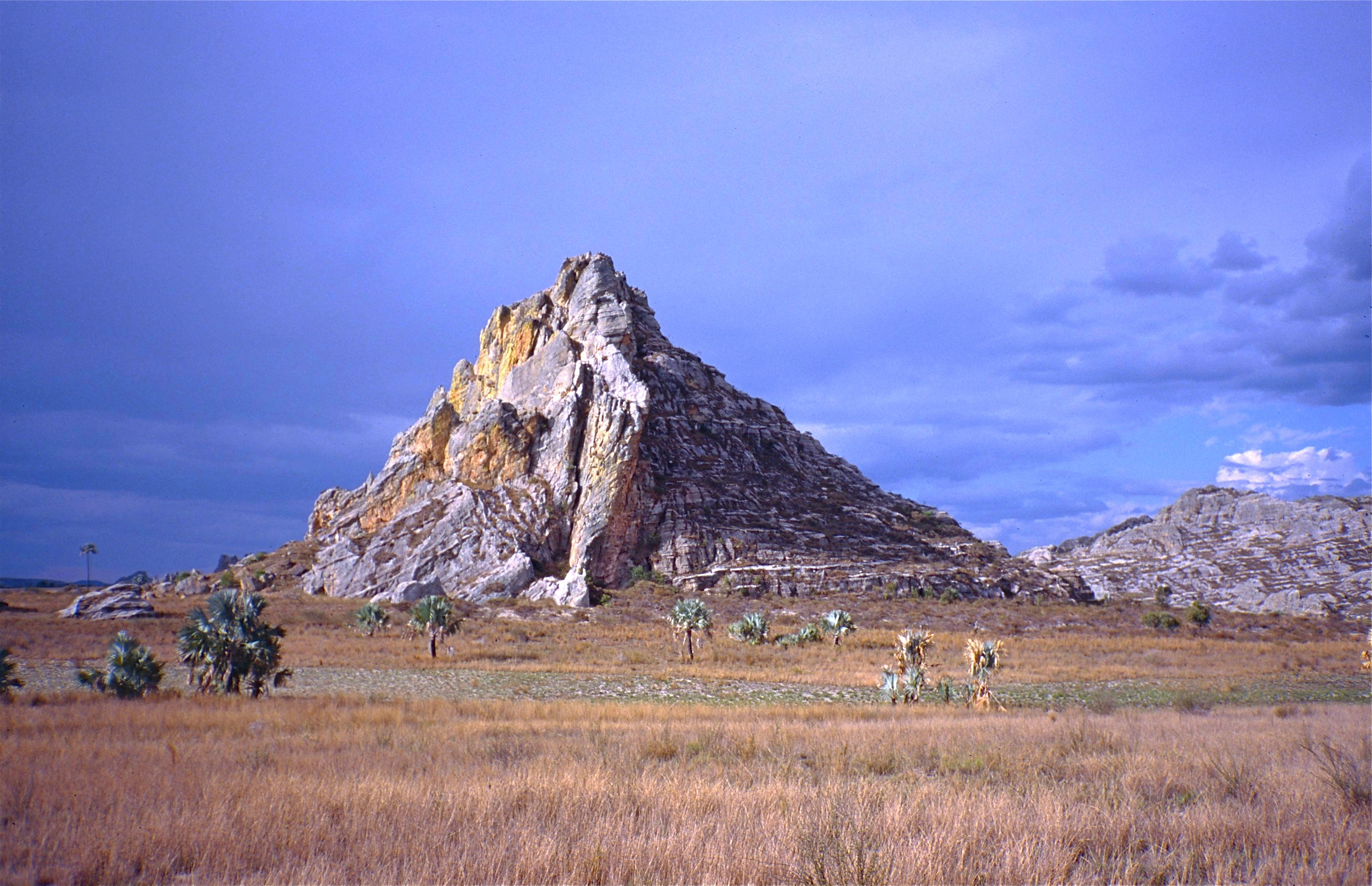
Plateau wooded grassland with the endemic Bismarck palm, Isalo National Park

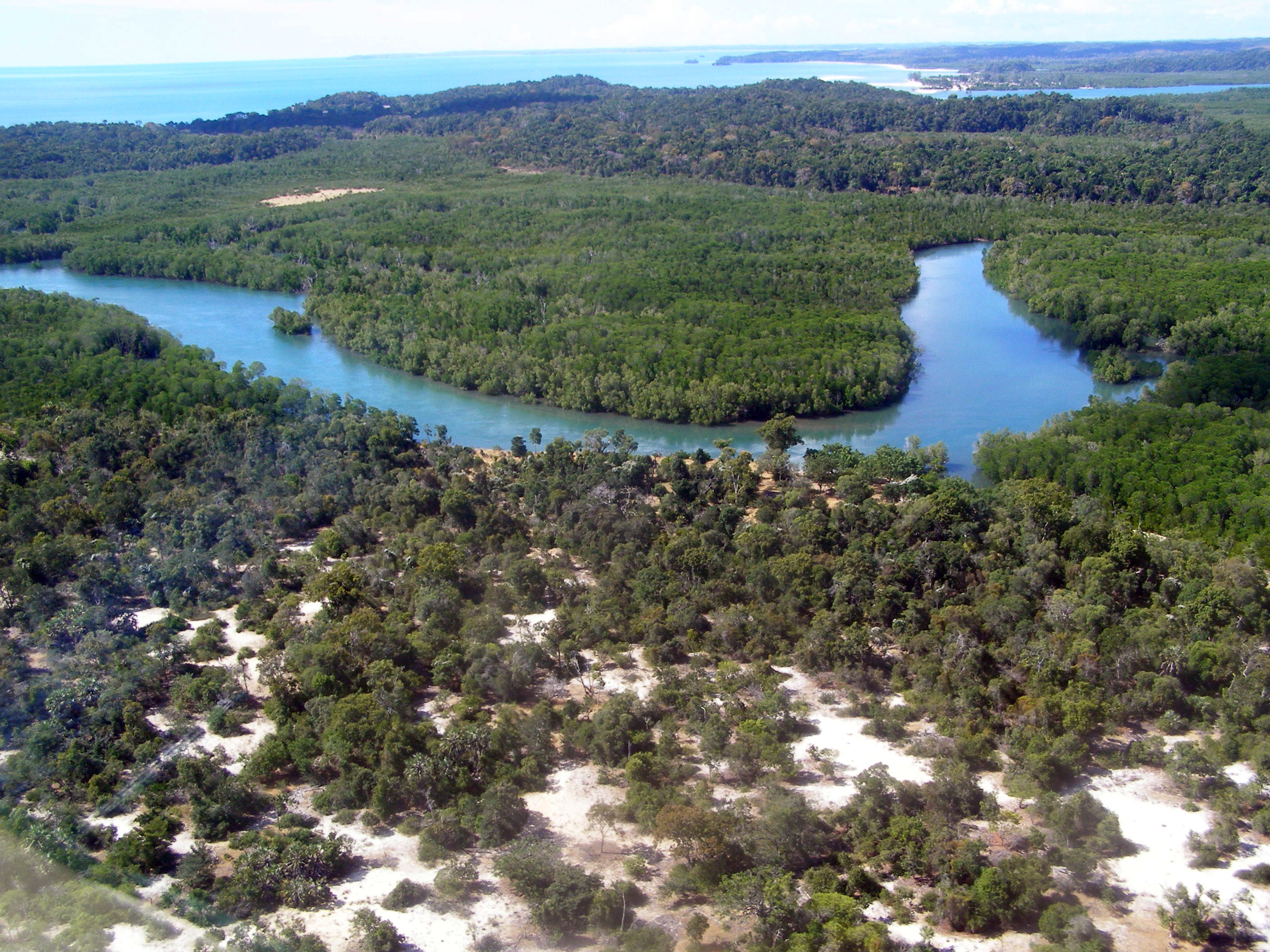
Western dry forest, with mangroves in the background

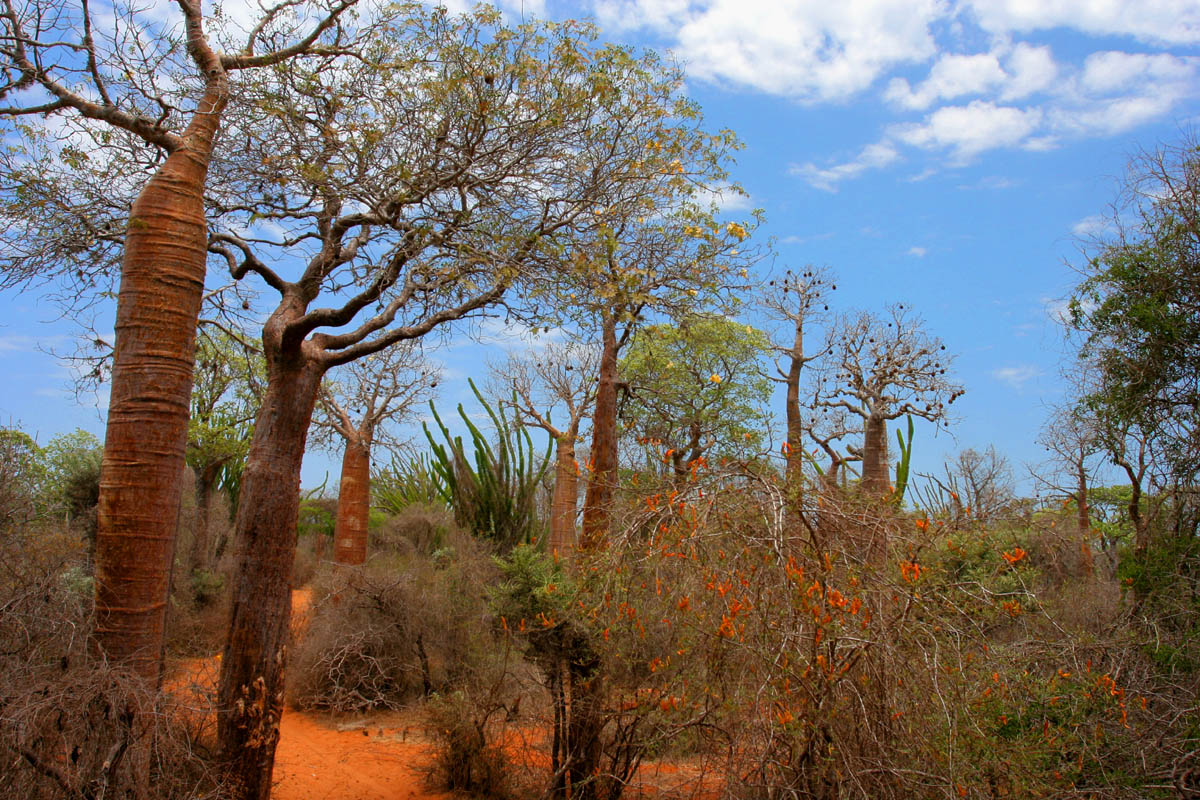
Spiny forest with baobabs and Madagascar ocotillo, near Ifaty

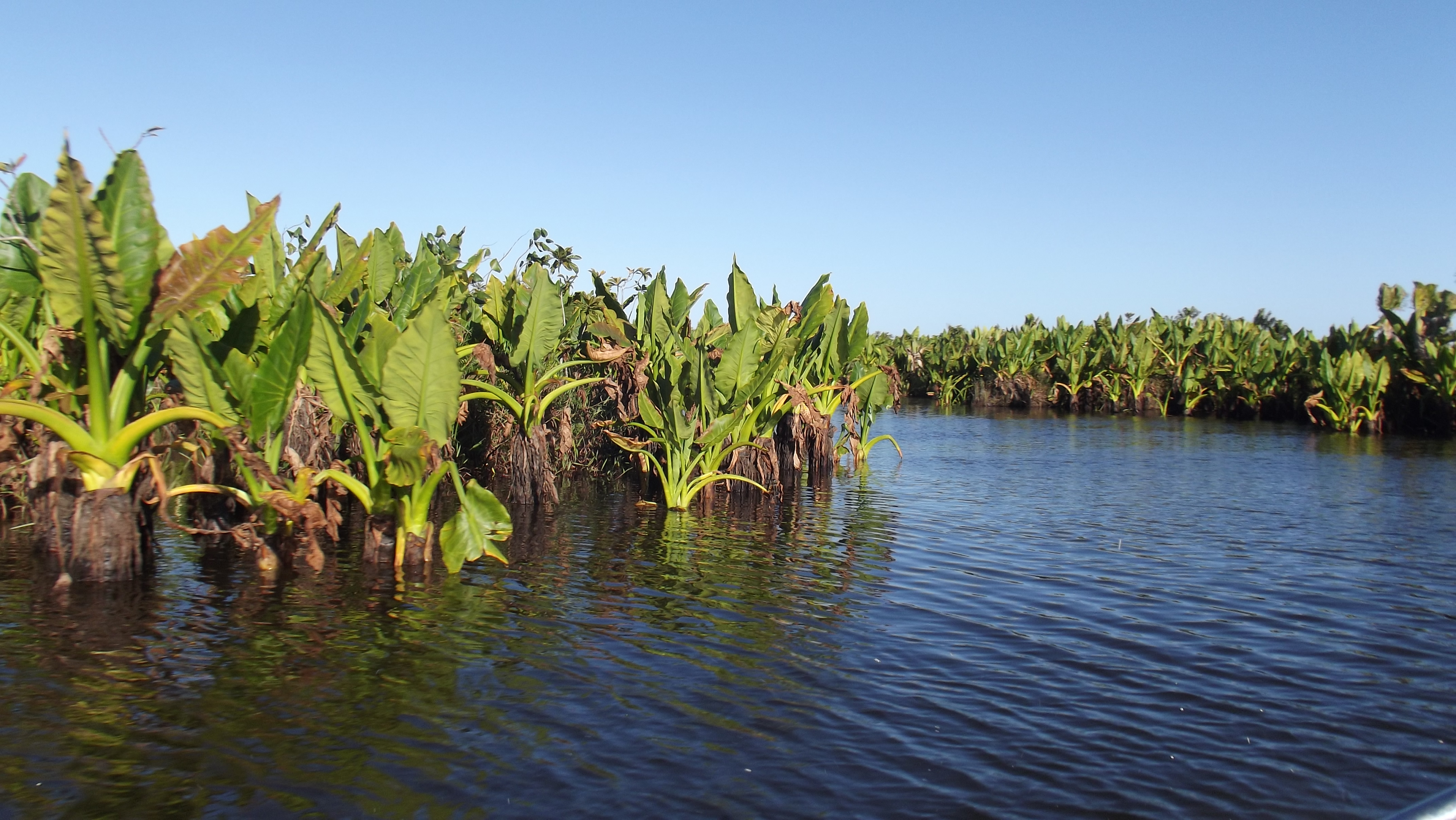
Lake vegetation with Typhonodorum lindleyanum

== Origins and evolution ==
=== Paleogeography ===
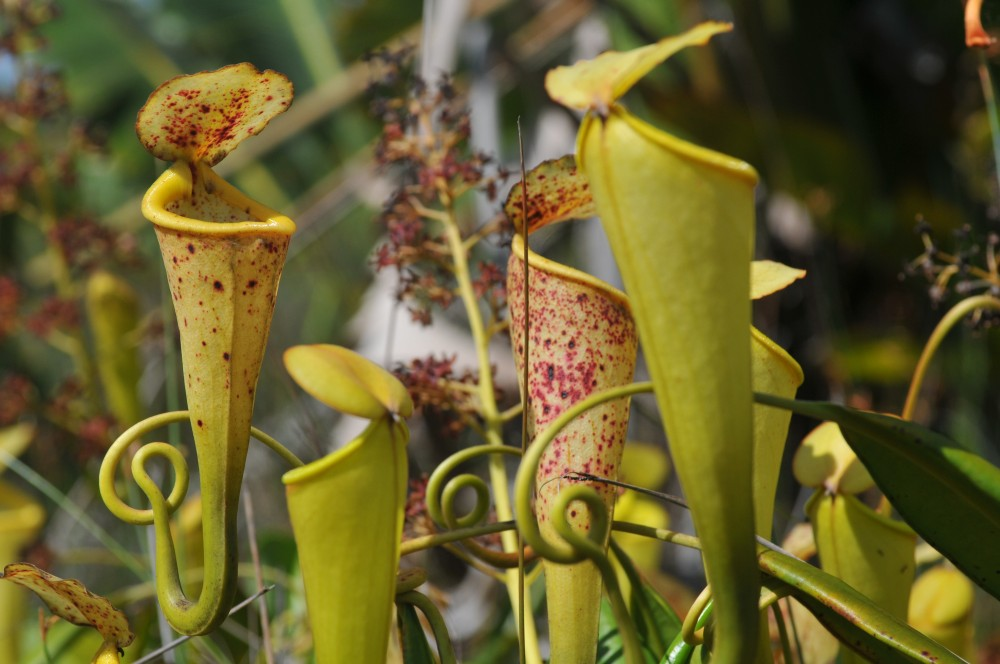
Nepenthes pitcher plants mainly occur in Southeast Asia but extend west to Madagascar (below: N. madagascariensis).

Madagascar's high species richness and endemicity are attributed to its long isolation as a continental island since the Mesozoic era. Once part of the Gondwana supercontinent, Madagascar separated from continental Africa and from the Indian subcontinent around 150–160 and 84–91 million years ago, respectively. The Madagascan flora was therefore long seen predominantly as a relict of an old Gondwanan vegetation, separated by vicariance through the continental break-up. Molecular clock analyses however suggest that most plant and other organismal lineages immigrated via across-ocean dispersal, given that they are estimated to have diverged from continental groups well after Gondwana broke up. The only endemic plant lineage on Madagascar old enough to be a possible Gondwana relict appears to be Takhtajania perrieri (Winteraceae). Most extant plant groups have African affinities, consistent with the relatively small distance to the continent, and there are also strong similarities with the Indian Ocean islands of the Comoros, Mascarenes, and Seychelles. There are however also links to other, more distant floras, such as those of India and Malesia.

After their separation from Africa, Madagascar and India moved northwards, to a position south of 30° latitude. During the Paleocene and Eocene, now separated from India, Madagascar moved northwards again and crossed the subtropical ridge. This passage likely induced a dry, desert-like climate across the island, which later contracted to what is today the sub-arid spiny thicket in the southwest. Humid forests probably established since the Oligocene, when India had cleared the eastern seaway, allowing trade winds to bring in rainfall, and Madagascar had moved north of the subtropical ridge. The intensification of the Indian Ocean monsoon system after around eight million years ago is believed to have further favoured the expansion of humid and sub-humid forests in the Late Miocene, especially in the northern Sambirano region. Some of the grasslands may also date to the Late Miocene, when there was a global grassland expansion.

=== Species evolution ===
Several hypotheses exist as to how plants and other organisms have diversified into so many species in Madagascar. They mainly assume either that species diverged in parapatry by gradually adapting to different environmental conditions on the island, for example dry versus humid, or lowland versus montane habitats, or that barriers such as large rivers, mountain ranges, or open land between forest fragments, favoured allopatric speciation. A Madagascan lineage of Euphorbia occurs across the island, but some species evolved succulent leaves, stems and tubers in adaptation to arid conditions. In contrast, endemic tree ferns (Cyathea) all evolved under very similar conditions in Madagascan humid forests, through three recent radiations in the Pliocene.

Madagascar's fauna is thought to have coevolved to a certain extent with its flora: The famous plant–pollinator mutualism predicted by Charles Darwin, between the orchid Angraecum sesquipedale and the moth Xanthopan morganii, is found on the island. Highly unstable rainfall in Madagascar was suggested to have created unpredictable patterns of flowering and fruiting in plants; this in turn would have narrowed opportunities for flower- and fruit-feeding animals and could explain their relatively low numbers in Madagascar. Among these, lemurs are the most important, but the historic extinctions of giant lemurs probably deprived some large-seeded plants of their seed dispersers. The extinct Madagascan megafauna also included grazers such as two giant tortoises (Aldabrachelys) and the Malagasy hippopotamuses, but it is unclear to what extent their habitats resembled today's widespread grasslands.

== Exploration and documentation ==
=== Early naturalists ===
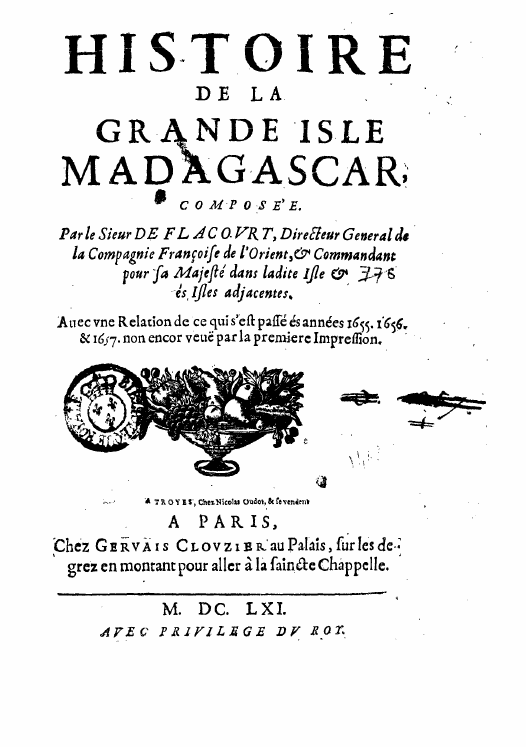
Histoire de la grande isle Madagascar by Étienne de Flacourt (1658) was the first detailed written account on Madagascar.

Madagascar and its natural history remained relatively unknown outside the island before the 17th century. Its only overseas connections were occasional Arab, Portuguese, Dutch, and English sailors, who brought home anecdotes and tales about the fabulous nature of Madagascar. With the growing influence of the French in the Indian Ocean, it was mainly French naturalists that documented Madagascar's flora in the following centuries.

Étienne de Flacourt, envoy of France at the military post of Fort Dauphin (Tolagnaro) in the south of Madagascar from 1648 to 1655, wrote the first detailed account of the island, Histoire de la grande isle Madagascar (1658), with a chapter dedicated to the flora. He was the first to mention the endemic pitcher plant Nepenthes madagascariensis and the Madagascar periwinkle. About one century later, in 1770, French naturalists and voyagers Philibert Commerson and Pierre Sonnerat visited the island from the Isle de France (now Mauritius). They collected and described a number of plant species, and many of Commerson's specimens were described later by Jean-Baptiste de Lamarck and Jean Louis Marie Poiret in France. Sonnerat described, among others, the emblematic traveller's tree. Another contemporary, Louis-Marie Aubert du Petit-Thouars, also visited Madagascar from the Isle de France; he collected on the island for six months and wrote, among others, Histoire des végétaux recueillis dans les îles australes d'Afrique and a work on orchids of Madagascar and the Mascarenes.

=== 19th to 20th century ===
French naturalist Alfred Grandidier was a preeminent 19th-century authority on Malagasy wildlife. His first visit in 1865 was followed by several other expeditions. He produced an atlas of the island and, in 1885, published L'Histoire physique, naturelle et politique de Madagascar, which would comprise 39 volumes. Although his main contributions were in zoology, he was also a prolific plant collector; several plants were named after him, including Grandidier's baobab (Adansonia grandidieri) and the endemic succulent genus Didierea. The British missionary and naturalist Richard Baron, Grandidier's contemporary, lived in Madagascar from 1872 to 1907 where he also collected plants and discovered up to 1,000 new species; many of his specimens were described by Kew botanist John Gilbert Baker. Baron was the first to catalogue Madagascar's vascular flora in his Compendium des plantes malgaches, including over 4,700 species and varieties known at that time.

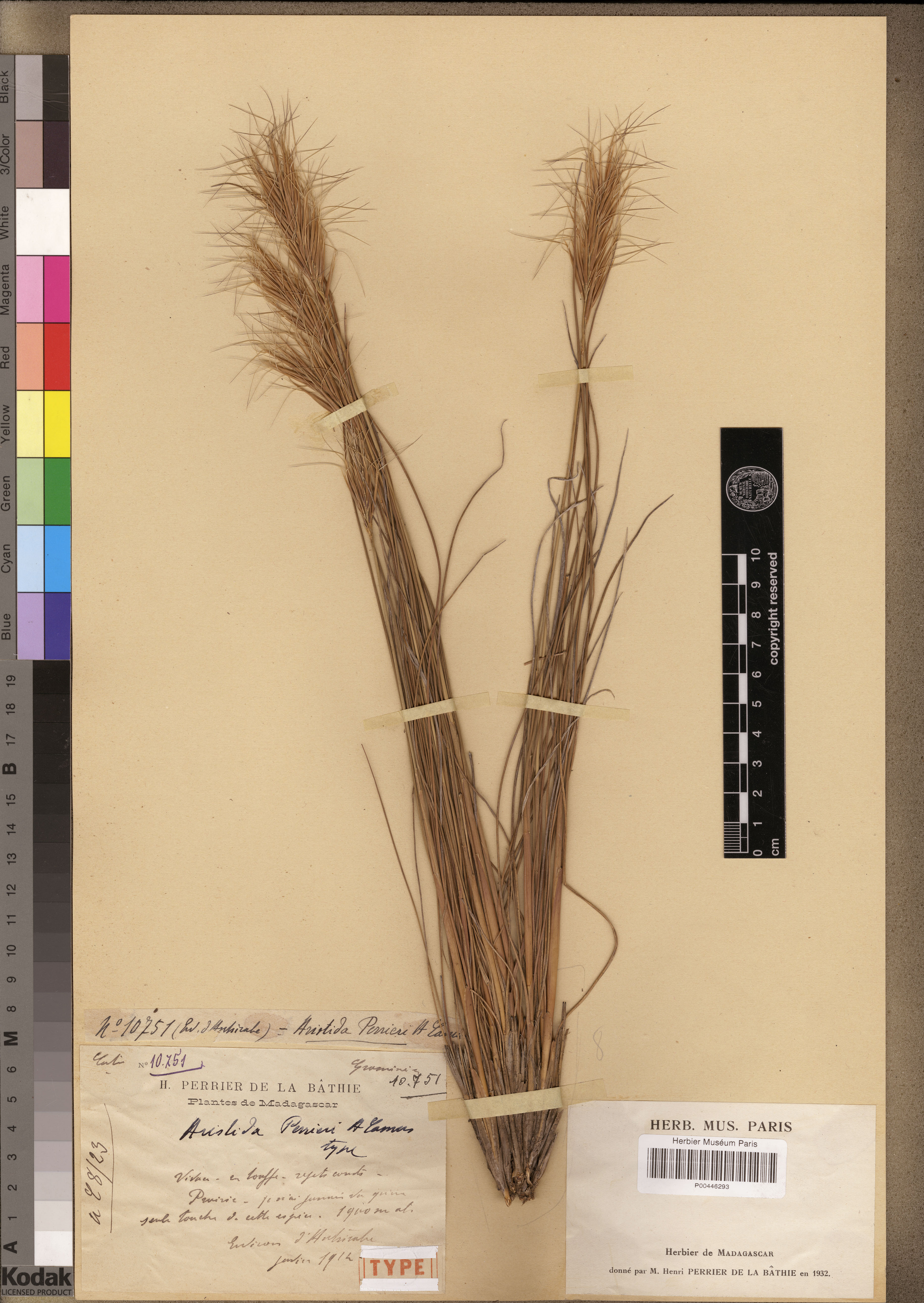
Sartidia perrieri, a now-extinct grass species collected only once, by Henri Perrier de la Bâthie in 1914, and described by Aimée Camus

During the French colonial period (1897 to 1958), Henri Perrier de la Bâthie was a major botanist in Madagascar. Beginning study in 1896, he compiled a large herbarium which he later donated to the National Museum of Natural History in Paris. Among his publications were notably the first classification of the island's vegetation, La végétation malgache (1921), and Biogéographie des plantes de Madagascar (1936), and he directed the publication of the Catalogue des plantes de Madagascar in 29 volumes. His contemporary and collaborator Henri Humbert, a professor in Algiers and later in Paris, made ten expeditions to Madagascar and, in 1936, initiated and edited the monograph series Flore de Madagascar et des Comores. A number of other important botanists, working in the colonial era through to Madagascar's independence, described more than 200 species each: Aimée Camus lived in France and specialised in grasses; René Capuron was a major contributor to the woody plant flora; and Jean Bosser, director of the French ORSTOM institute in Antananarivo, worked with grasses, sedges, and orchids. Roger Heim was one of the major mycologists working in Madagascar.

=== Research in the 21st century ===
Today, national and international research institutions are documenting the flora of Madagascar. The Botanical and Zoological Garden of Tsimbazaza hosts a botanical garden and the country's largest herbarium with over 80,000 specimens. The FO.FI.FA (Center for Research on Rural Development) herbarium has some 60,000 specimens of primarily woody plants; a number of them and those of the Tsimbazaza herbarium have been digitised and are available online through JSTOR and Tropicos. The University of Antananarivo has a department for plant biology and ecology.

Outside the country, Royal Botanic Gardens, Kew, is one of the leading institutions in the revision of Madagascar's plant families; it also maintains the Kew Madagascar Conservation Centre and cooperates with the Silo National des Graines Forestières to build a seed bank of Madagascan plants in the Millennium Seed Bank project. The National Museum of Natural History in Paris has traditionally been one of the centres of research on the flora of Madagascar. It holds a herbarium with roughly 700,000 Malagasy plant specimens and a seed bank and living collection, and continues to edit the Flore de Madagascar et des Comores series begun by Humbert in 1936. The Missouri Botanical Garden maintains the Catalogue of the plants of Madagascar, a major online resource, and also has a permanent base in Madagascar.

== Human impact ==
Madagascar was colonised rather recently compared to other landmasses, with first evidence for humans – arrived from either Africa or Asia – dating to 2,300 or perhaps 4,000 years before present. It is assumed that humans first stayed near the coast and penetrated into the interior only several centuries later. The settlers had a profound impact on the long-isolated environment of Madagascar through land clearing and fire, introduction of zebu cattle, and probably hunting to extinction the native megafauna including, among others, elephant birds, giant lemurs and giant tortoises. The first Europeans arrived in the 16th century, starting an age of overseas exchange. Population growth and transformation of the landscape was particularly rapid since the mid-20th century.

=== Uses of native species ===
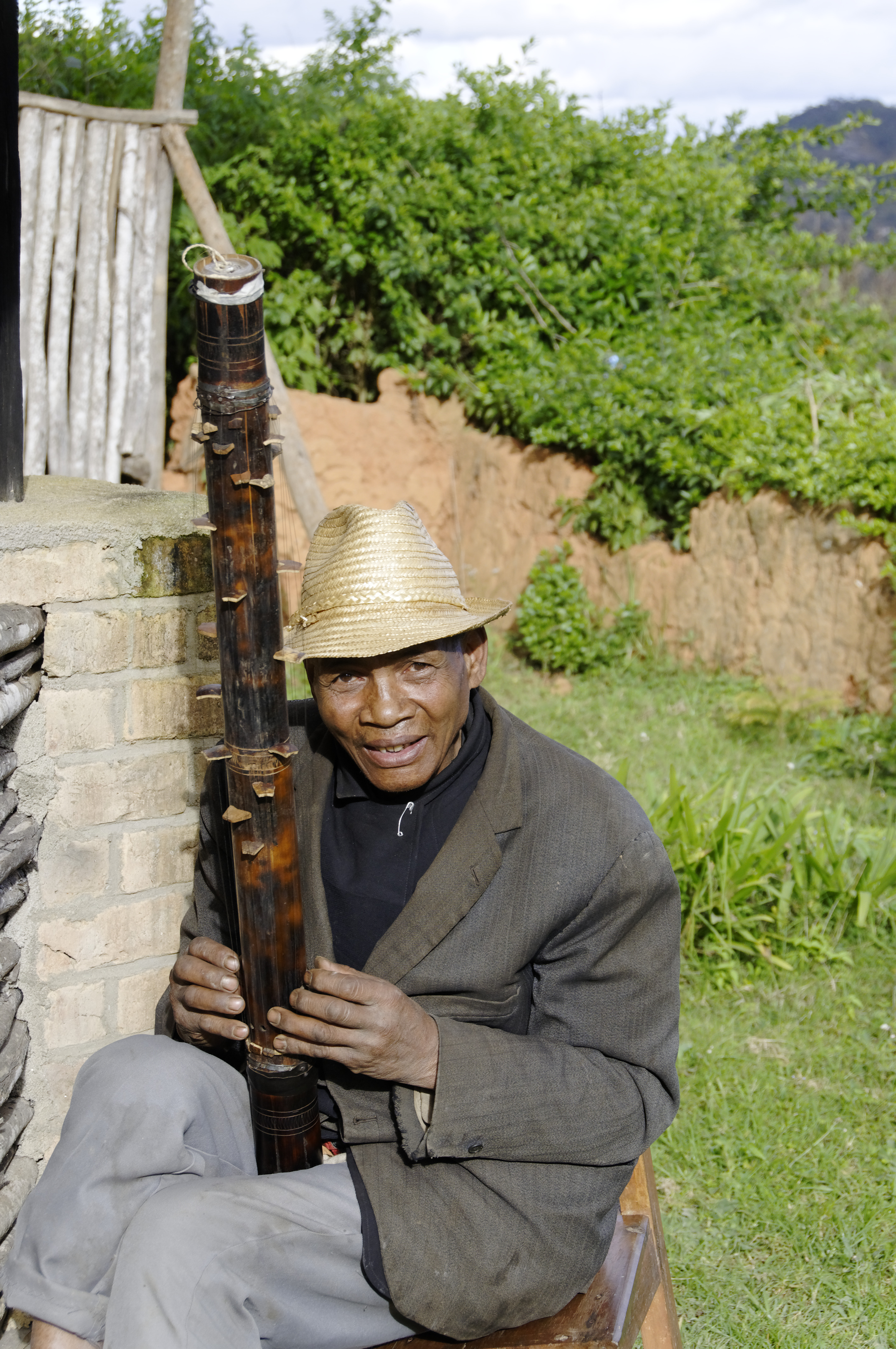
The Malagasy valiha zither is made from bamboo.

The native flora of Madagascar has been and still is used for a variety of purposes by the Malagasy people. More than a hundred plants used locally and commercially were described at the end of the 19th century by the English naturalist Richard Baron. These included many timber trees such as native ebony (Diospyros) and rosewood (Dalbergia) species, the raffia palm Raphia farinifera used for fibre, dyeing plants, as well as medicinal and edible plants.

The traveller's tree has various uses in the east of Madagascar, chiefly as building material. Madagascar's national instrument valiha is made from bamboo and lent its name to the endemic genus Valiha. Yams (Dioscorea) in Madagascar include introduced, widely cultivated species as well as some 30 endemics, all edible. Edible mushrooms, including endemic species, are collected and sold locally (see above, Diversity and endemism: Non-vascular plants and fungi).

Many native plant species are used as herbal remedies for a variety of afflictions. An ethnobotanical study in the southwestern littoral forest, for instance, found 152 native plants used locally as medicine, and countrywide, over 230 plant species have been used as traditional malaria treatments. The diverse flora of Madagascar holds potential for natural product research and drug production on an industrial scale; the Madagascar periwinkle (Cataranthus roseus), a source of alkaloids used in the treatment of different cancers, is a famous example.

=== Agriculture ===
One of the characteristic features of agriculture in Madagascar is the widespread cultivation of rice. The cereal is a staple of Malagasy cuisine and has been an important export crop since pre-colonial times. It was likely introduced with early Austronesian settlers, and archaeobotanical remains evidence its presence in Madagascar at least by the 11th century. Both the indica and japonica varieties were introduced early on. Rice was first cultivated in mud flats and marshes near the coast, reaching the highlands much later. Its widespread cultivation in terraced fields was promoted with the expansion of the Imerina kingdom in the 19th century. Land conversion for rice cultivation has been an important cause of wetlands loss.

Other major crops, such as greater yam, coconut, taro and turmeric are also believed to have been brought in by early settlers from Asia. Other crops have a likely African origin, such as cowpea, bambara groundnut, oil palm, and tamarind. Some crops like teff, sorghum, common millet and plantain may have been present before colonisation, but it is possible that humans brought new cultivars. Arab traders presumably brought fruits such as mango, pomegranate, and grapes. Later European traders and colonists introduced crops like litchi and avocado and promoted the cultivation of exports like cloves, coconut, coffee and vanilla in plantations. Today Madagascar is the primary vanilla-producing country worldwide.

Forestry in Madagascar involves many exotic species such as eucalypts, pines and acacias. The traditional slash-and-burn agriculture (tavy), practised for centuries, today accelerates the loss of primary forests as populations grow (see below, Threats and conservation).

=== Introduced plants ===
More than 1,300 exotic plants have been reported in Madagascar, with the legumes (Fabaceae) the most frequent family. This represents around 10% relative to the native flora, a ratio lower than in many islands and closer to what is known for continental floras. Many exotic plant species have been introduced for agriculture or other uses. Around 600 species have naturalised and some are considered invasive. A notorious example is the South American water hyacinth (Eichhornia crassipes), which spread widely through subtropical and tropical regions and is considered a serious plant pest in wetlands. In general, invasive plants spread mostly in already disturbed, secondary vegetation, and the remaining primary forests of the east appear little affected.

A prickly pear cactus, Opuntia monacantha, was introduced to southwest Madagascar in the late 18th century by French colonialists, who used it as natural fence to protect military forts and gardens. The cactus quickly spread and found use as cattle feed by Antandroy pastoralists. In the early 20th century, cochineals were introduced as a biological control for the plant, which had become a nuisance; they rapidly eradicated most of the cacti. This probably led to famine among the Antandroy people, although some authors challenge the causal link between famine and cactus eradication. Today, several Opuntia species are again present mainly in the south, spreading into native vegetation in some areas.

The prickly pear illustrates the dilemma of plant introductions: while many authors see exotic plants as a threat to the native flora, others argue that they have not yet been linked directly to the extinction of a native species, and that some may actually provide economic or ecological benefits. A number of plants native to Madagascar have become invasive in other regions, such as the traveller's tree in Réunion and the flamboyant tree (Delonix regia) in various tropical countries.

=== Threats and conservation ===
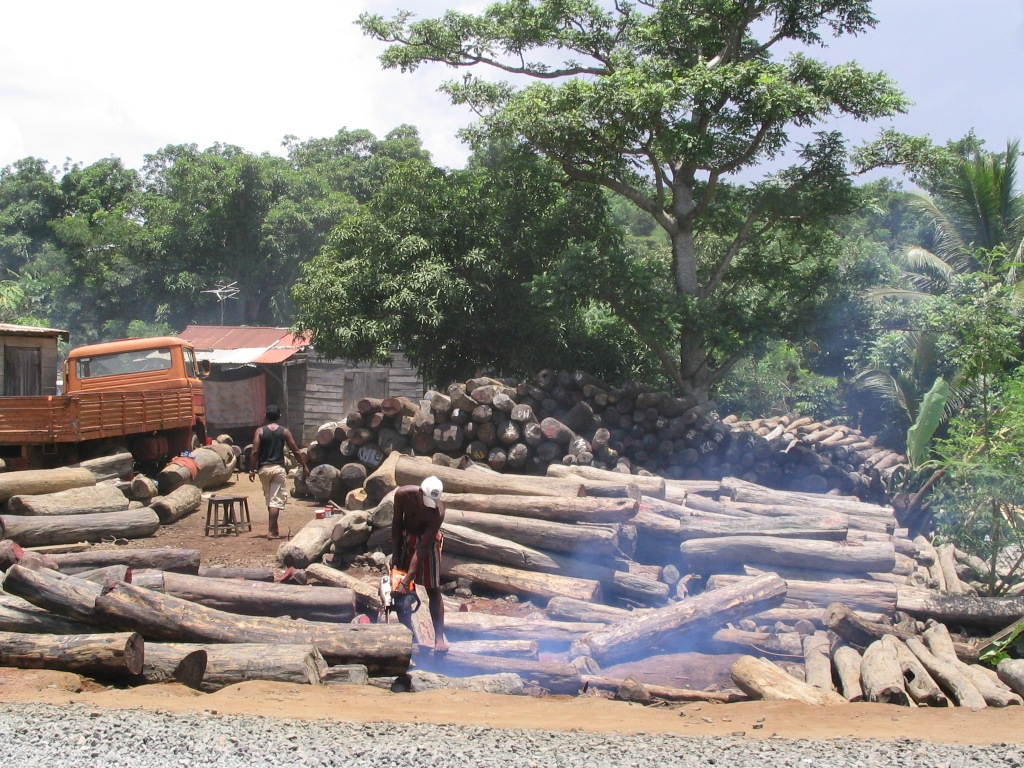
Illegal logging of rosewood in the north of Madagascar

Madagascar, together with its neighbouring islands, is considered a biodiversity hotspot because of its high species richness and endemism coupled with a dramatic decrease of primary vegetation. Six of the seven WWF ecoregions in Madagascar (see Vegetation types) are considered "critical/endangered". Data on the distribution and status of many native plants in Madagascar are still lacking, but a 2011 Red List assessed 1,676 endemic vascular plant species and found over 1,000 of them to be endangered or critically endangered.

Rapid human population increase and economic activity entail habitat loss and fragmentation, in particular massive deforestation. Forest cover decreased by around 40% from the 1950s to 2000, and the remaining forests are highly fragmented. Slash-and-burn cultivation has a long tradition but with an ever-denser population, forest is cut faster than it regrows, especially in the humid east. In addition, illegal logging of luxury timber species such as rosewood and ebony increased especially with the 2009 Malagasy political crisis. Rare plants, such as endemic succulents and baobabs, are threatened by harvest and trade for horticulture, food, or cosmetics. Global warming is expected to reduce or shift climatically suitable areas for plant species and threatens coastal habitats, such as littoral forests, through rising sea levels.

Conservation of natural habitats in Madagascar is concentrated in over six million hectares (23,000 sq mi) – about ten percent of the total land surface – of national parks and other nature reserves, an area that has tripled from 2003 to 2013. These protected areas include the World Heritage sites Tsingy de Bemaraha and the Rainforests of the Atsinanana. Some critically endangered plant species have been grown ex situ in nursery programmes, and seeds have been collected and stored in the Millennium Seed Bank project. Madagascar is the country with the highest proportion of its flora listed in the CITES convention, which aims to control trade in endangered species. To reduce unsustainable deforestation by local communities, better land-use planning, crop intensification and diversification, promotion of non-timber forest products, economic empowerment through land tenure security and access to credit, and family planning have been proposed. The restoration of wildlife corridors between fragmented habitats to support species migration has been proposed for climate change adaptation. To reduce species loss along coastal areas targeted for titanium extraction, agreements with the QMM mining company include the setting aside of conservation areas and habitat restoration.
