= Borocera attenuata =

Scientific classification
- Kingdom: Animalia
- Phylum: Arthropoda
- Class: Insecta
- Order: Lepidoptera
- Family: Lasiocampidae
- Genus: Borocera
- Species: B. attenuata

Binomial name
- Borocera attenuata (Kenrick, 1914)

Synonyms
- Gonometa attenuata (Kenrick, 1914)

Species of moth

Borocera attenuata is a species of Lasiocampidae moth native to Madagascar. It was first described by George Hamilton Kenrick in 1914.

The males have a wingspan of 46 mm. Their head, palpi and the underside of the thorax are dull orange; antennaes, legs, thorax above and abdomen have a dark chestnut colour. The forewings are dark brown and the hindwings smoky brown.
