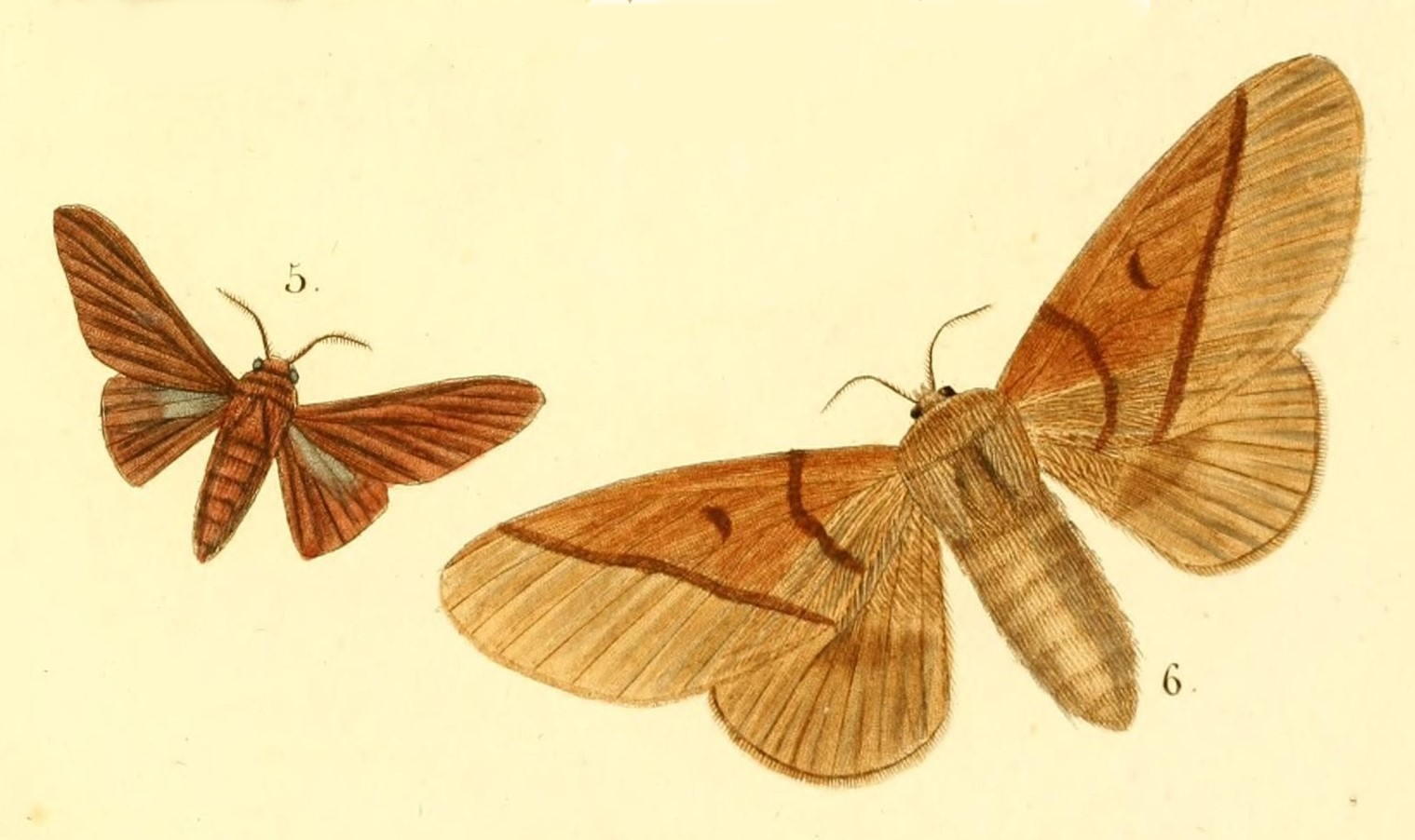

Scientific classification
- Kingdom: Animalia
- Phylum: Arthropoda
- Class: Insecta
- Order: Lepidoptera
- Family: Lasiocampidae
- Genus: Borocera
- Species: B. madagascariensis

Binomial name
- Borocera madagascariensis Boisduval, 1833

Synonyms
- Borocera bibindandy Camboué, 1886; Borocera cervicolora (Leach, 1815)

= Borocera madagascariensis =

Species of insect

Borocera madagascariensis is a species of lasiocampid moth endemic to coastal Madagascar. It is one of three species of silk producing moths found on the island of Madagascar. B. madagascariensis is often confused with the similar Borocera cajani, which is distributed throughout the island and whose silk is more widely used for silk production. Many publications erroneously refer to B. cajani as B. madagascariensis. It shares the common name of landibe with B. cajani. The pupae of B. madagascariensis is consumed by the people of Madagascar, and is known in Malagasy as soherina.

B. madagascariensis feeds on Cajanus cajan, Eugenia, Manihot esculenta, Prunus persica, Psidium guajava, and Uapaca bojeri.
