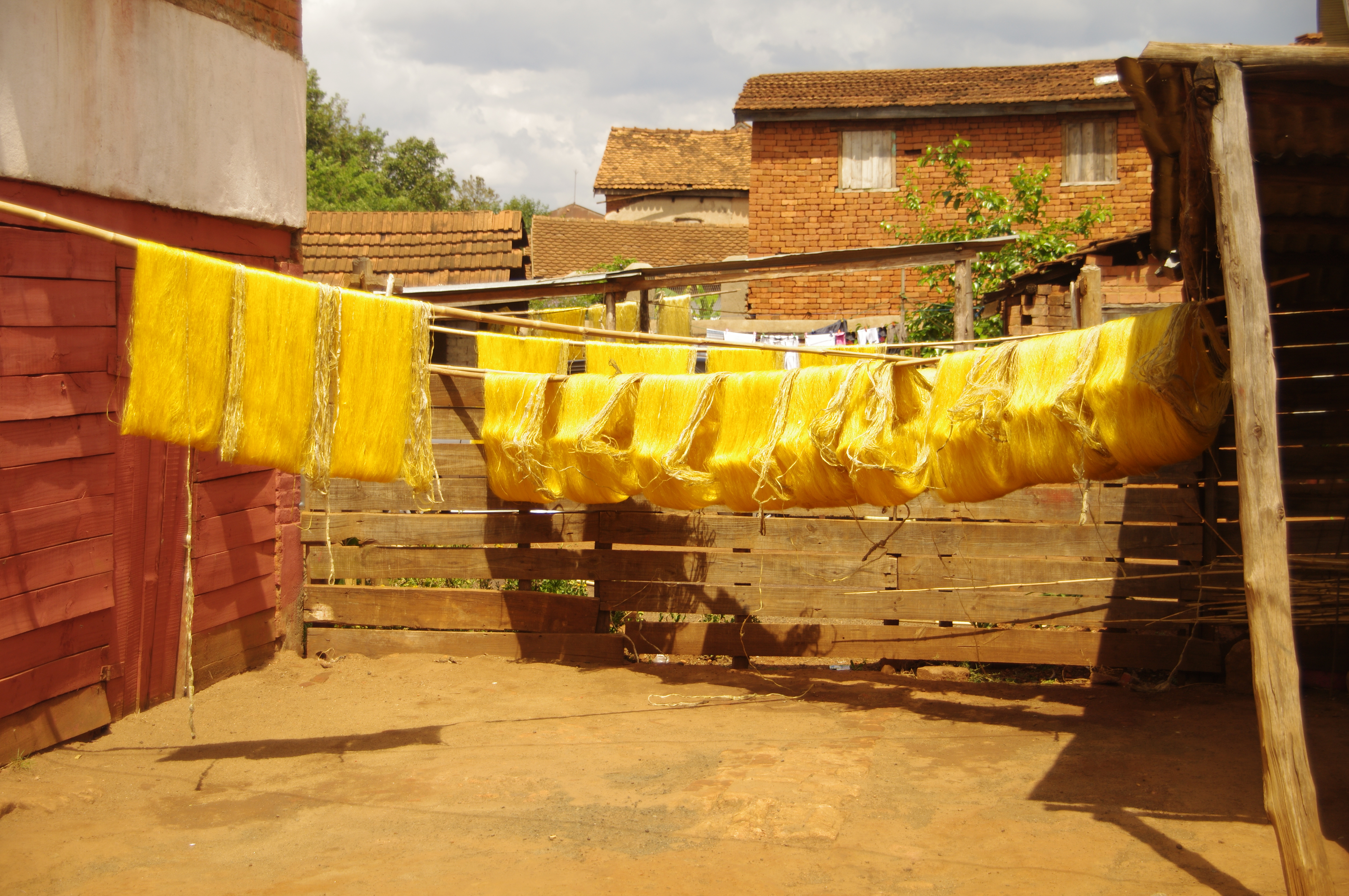
- Borocera cajani silk

Scientific classification
- Kingdom: Animalia
- Phylum: Arthropoda
- Class: Insecta
- Order: Lepidoptera
- Family: Lasiocampidae
- Subfamily: Lasiocampinae
- Genus: Borocera; Boisduval, 1833

Synonyms
- Libethra Saalmüller, 1884

= Borocera =

Genus of moths

Borocera is a genus of moths in the family Lasiocampidae. The genus was erected by Jean Baptiste Boisduval in 1833.

== Species ==
- Borocera attenuata (Kenrick, 1914)
- Borocera aurantiaca Viette, 1962
- Borocera cajani Vinson, 1863
- Borocera madagascariensis Boisduval, 1833
- Borocera madinyka Conte, 1909
- Borocera marginepunctata Guérin-Méneville, 1844
- Borocera mimus De Lajonquière, 1973
- Borocera nigricornis De Lajonquière, 1973
- Borocera regius De Lajonquière, 1973
