= Imamo =

Malagasy kingdom

Kingdom of Imamo Fanjakan'Imamo (Malagasy)
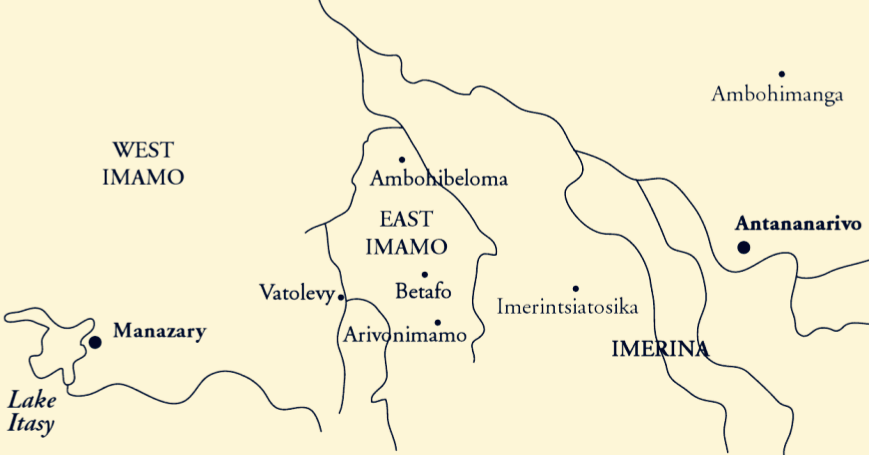
- Capital: Manazary (Former, later for Western Imamo); Ambohibeloma (Eastern Imamo)
- Religion: Traditional beliefs
- Government: Absolute monarchy
- Historical era: Pre-colonial
Succeeded by
Merina kingdom
- Today part of: Madagascar

Imamo was a Malagasy kingdom in the region of Itasy in central Madagascar. Imamo was an independent kingdom westward of Imerina.

== History ==
The first king of Imamo, Andriambahoaka, settled the boundaries of his kingdom and Imerina during Andriamasinavalona's time. Imamo was split in two after the death of Andriambahoaka's son, Andriampivovo. The eastern part of Imamo was ceded to Andriampivovo's son, Andriampovoanandriamanitra, while the western part of the kingdom was given to his nephew, Andriapanarifito. The last Western Imamo King, Andriamary, submitted peacefully to Andrianampoinimerina. Eastern Imamo resisted to the Imerina army and fell after the siege of its capital, Ambohibeloma. The last king of eastern Imamo Andrampoetsakarivo was later executed at Tampoketsa. Imamo was absorbed into the Imerina district of Ambodirano.
