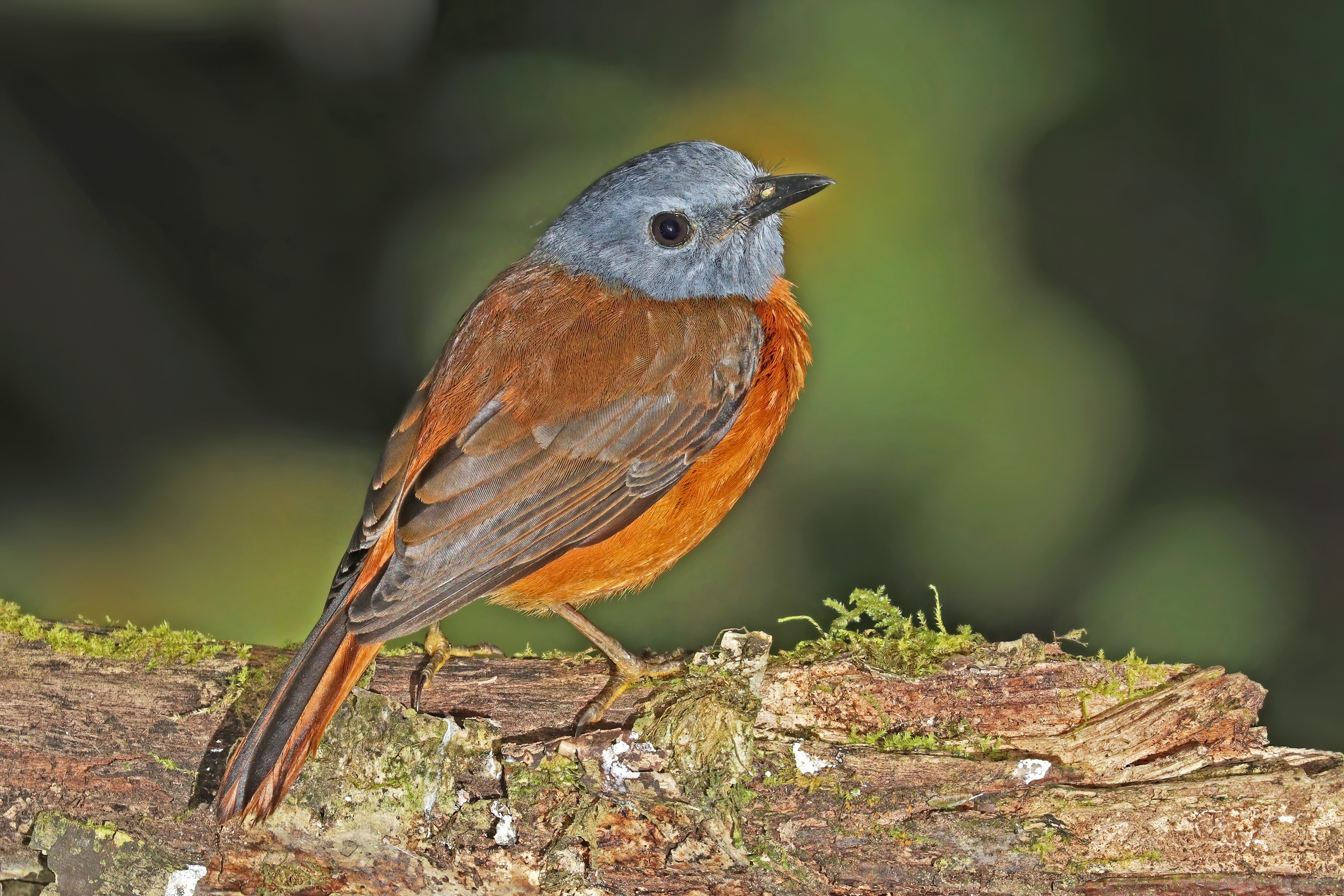
- male, Montagne d'Ambre National Park

Conservation status
- Near Threatened (IUCN 3.1)

Scientific classification
- Kingdom: Animalia
- Phylum: Chordata
- Class: Aves
- Order: Passeriformes
- Family: Muscicapidae
- Genus: Monticola
- Species: M. erythronotus

Binomial name
- Monticola erythronotus (Lavauden, 1929)

Synonyms
- Pseudocossyphus erythronotus

= Amber Mountain rock thrush =

Species of bird

The Amber Mountain rock thrush (Monticola erythronotus) is a songbird in the family Muscicapidae. It was formerly considered a subspecies of the forest rock thrush (Monticola sharpei).

== Distribution ==
The Amber Mountain rock thrush is endemic to Madagascar where it occurs only on the Amber Mountain massif in the north of the island.

== Description ==
This is a small forest-dwelling thrush, growing to a length of about 16 cm (6.3 in). Males have blue hoods, chestnut upperparts, bright orange tail with brown central feathers and orange underparts. Females are mostly brown with an orange wash on the underparts and lack the blue hood. Males are distinguished from other rock-thrushes by the dark rufous back, while the females have bright orange tails and lack white streaking on the breast.

== Habitat and ecology ==
It inhabits mid-altitude and montane humid, evergreen forest from 800 to 1,300 m (2,600 to 4,300 ft), and forages inconspicuously in the understorey and on the ground, sometimes sallying to take aerial prey. The species nests in tree hollows or in crevices under overhangs.

== Conservation status ==
The Amber Mountain rock thrush is listed by the International Union for Conservation of Nature and Natural Resources as Near Threatened because it has a very small range and its forest habitat is declining in both area and quality. The population is small, but believed to be stable. The total population of this species is estimated to number between 2,500 – 4,500 mature individuals as of 2025, which occur in a single block of forest in the Amber Mountain National Park.

== Taxonomic notes ==
The Amber Mountain rock thrush was historically regarded as a subspecies of forest rock thrush (M. sharpei), but was split into a standalone species by HBW taxonomy (used by the IUCN) in 2010. A 2011 phylogenetic study further indicated that the Amber Mountain rock thrush is genetically separate from other members of Monticila. As of the release of the IOC World Bird List version 13.1 in 2023, all major taxonomies consider it a full species.

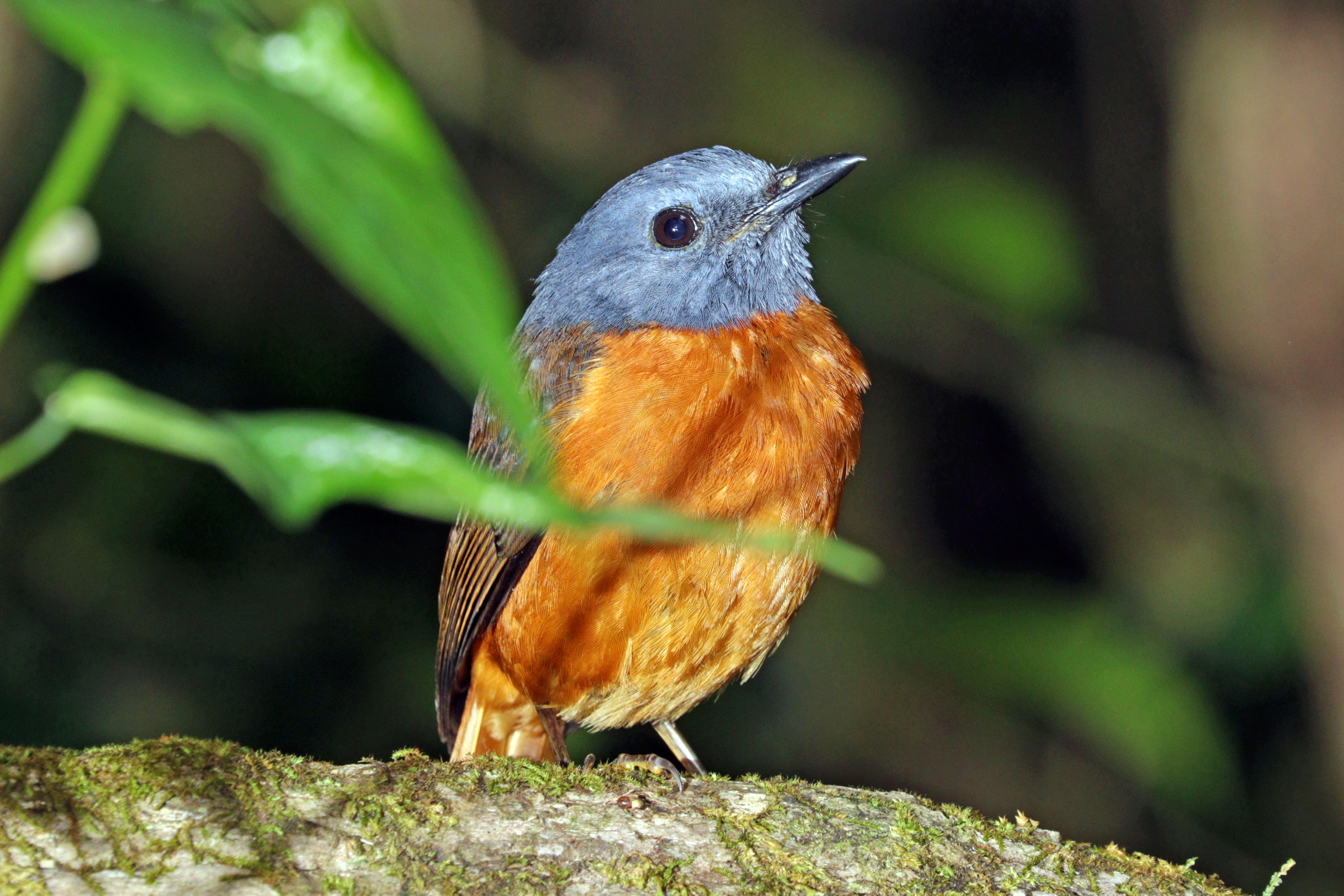
male

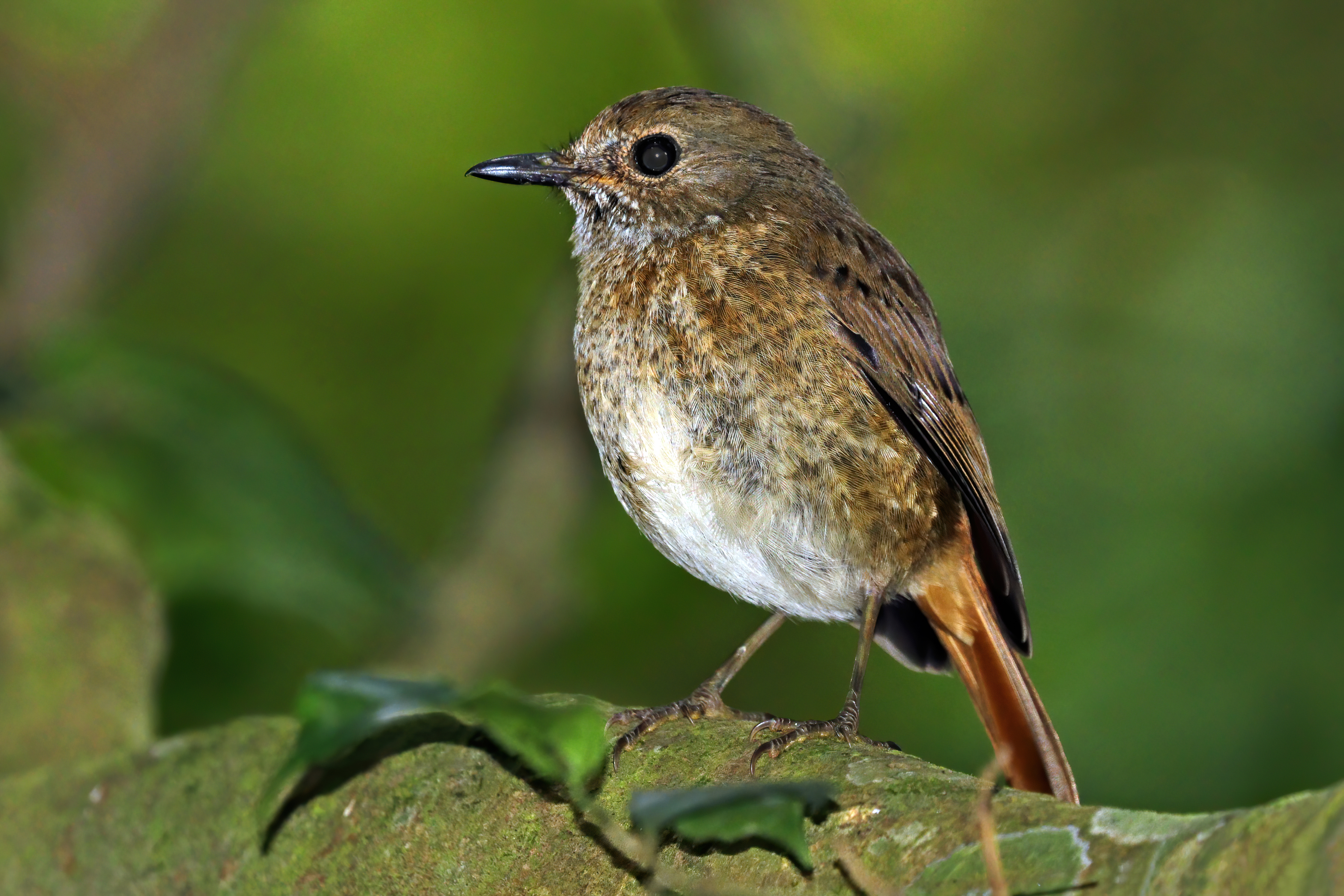
female

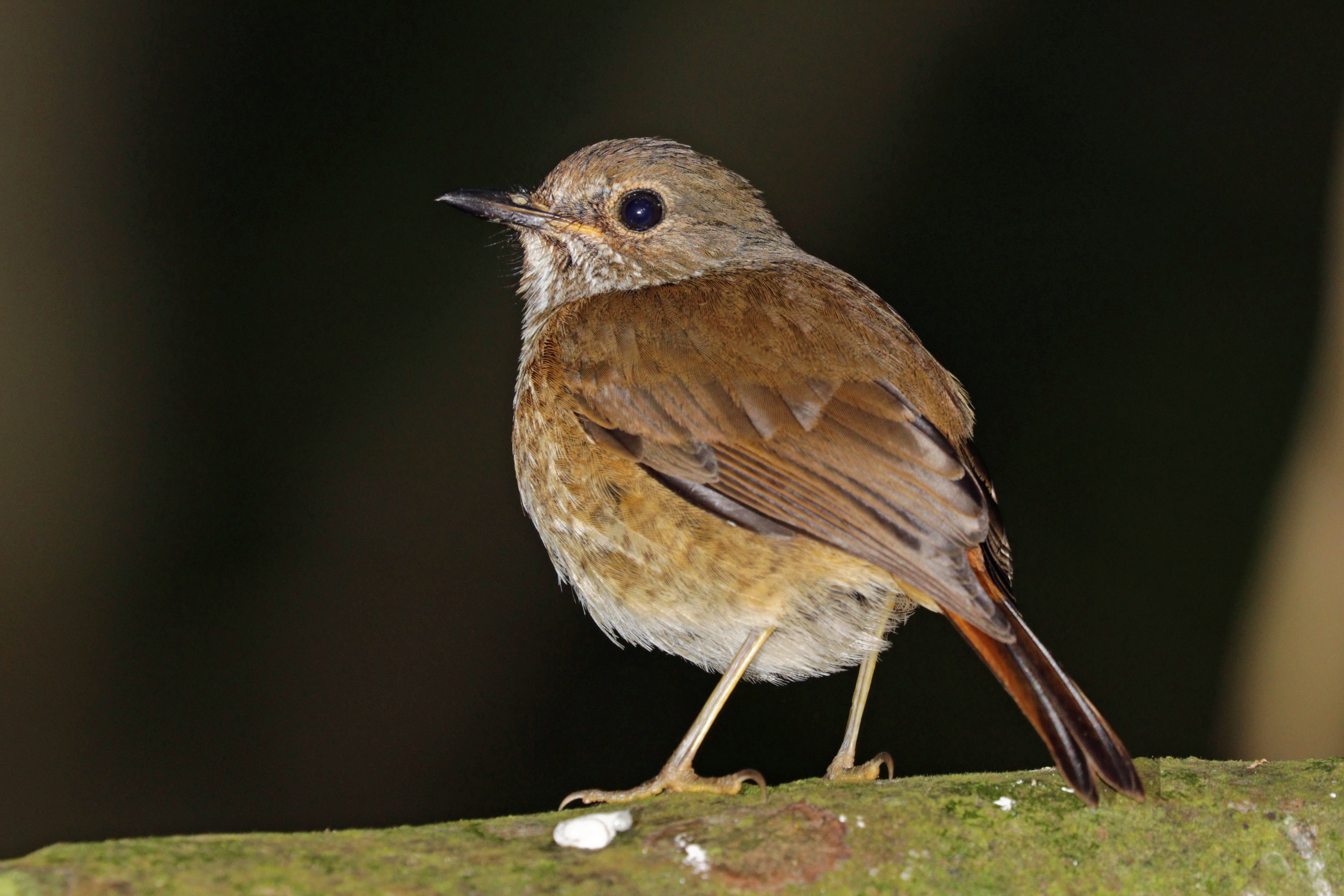
female
