= List of lichens of Madagascar =

Little work has been done on the lichens of Madagascar, so while over 500 species of lichens have been documented, more are expected. Madagascar can be divided into two major habitats that can be associated with lichen distribution. Wet tropical areas of siliceous bedrock make up approximately two-thirds of the country, and are where most of the lichens have been documented. Dry tropical areas of granitic and limestone bedrock make up the other one-third of the country with just over 20 species documented in these habitats. The following table lists the species known from the dry tropical habitats. The majority are corticolous species that grow on the bark of trees or shrubs. A few are saxicolous; species that grow on rocks.

Species	Type
Canoparmelia quintarigera Aptroot	Corticolous
Clandestinotrema minutum Aptroot	Corticolous
Contrictolumina leucostoma (Müll. Arg.) Lücking & al.	Corticolous
Crespoa inhaminensis (C. W. Dodge) Lendemer & B. P. Hodk.	Corticolous
Dermatiscum thunbergii (Ach.) Nyl.	Saxicolous
Dirina madagascariensis Tehler & al.	Corticolous
Dirinaria complicata D. D. Awasthi	Corticolous
Glyphis scyphulifera (Ach.) Staiger	Corticolous
Isalonactis madagascariensis Ertz. & al.	Corticolous
Lecanora helva Stizenb	Corticolous
Lecanora leprosa Fée	Corticolous
Lecanora subflava Tuck.	Corticolous
Lecanora tropica Zahlbr.	Corticolous
Mycoporum californicum (Zahlbr.) R. C. Harris	Corticolous
Opegrapha varians (Müll. Arg.) Vain.	Corticolous
Roccella africana Vain.	Corticolous
Roccella applanata M. Choisy	Corticolous
Roccella belangeriana D. D. Awasthi	Corticolous
Roccella boryi Delise ex Fée	Corticolous
Roccella linearis (Ach.) Vain.	Corticolous
Roccella montagnei Bél.	Corticolous
Sclerophyton madagascariense Sparrius	Corticolous
Xanthoparmelia subflabellata (J. Steiner) Hale	Saxicolous

While many of the lichens found to date in Madagascar are relatively widespread, tropical species, some are endemic. Isalonactis madagascariensis, for example, is known only from its type locality near Isalo National Park, and new species continue to be found.

== Gallery ==
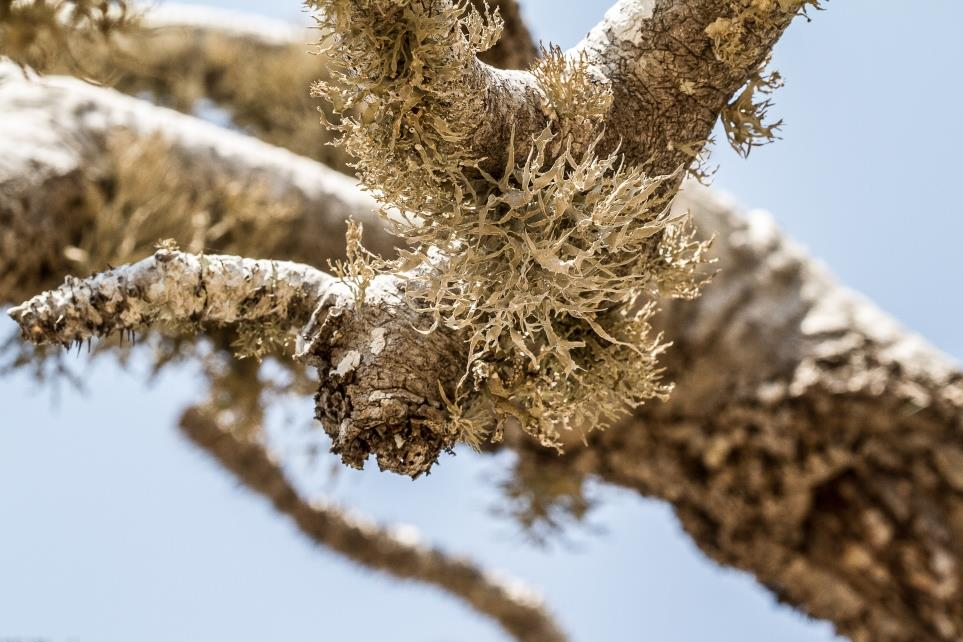
Lichens at Tsimanampetsotsa National Park, Madagascar

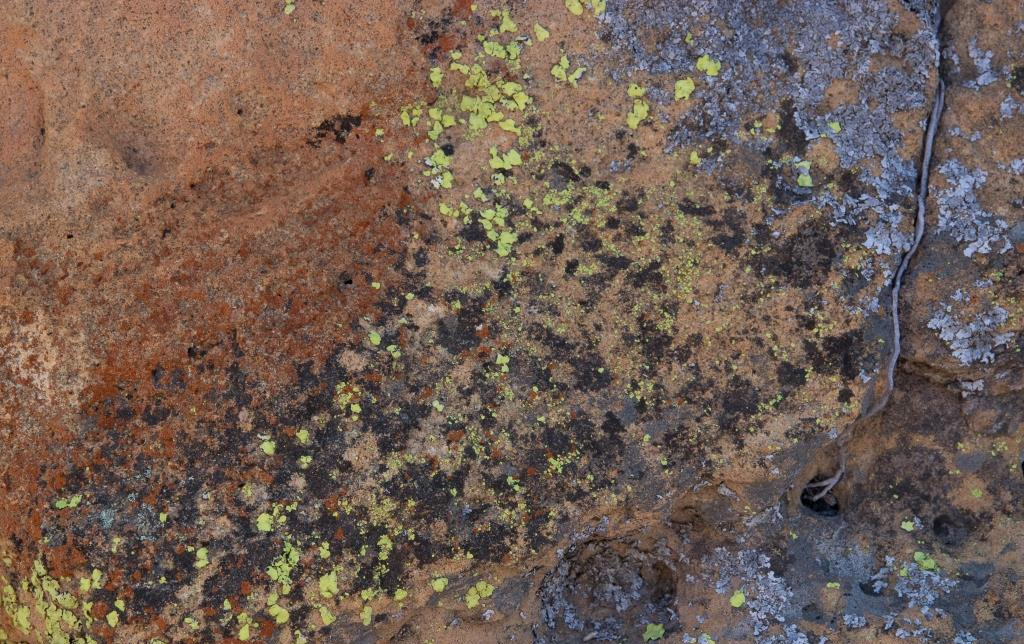
Lichens at Isalo National Park

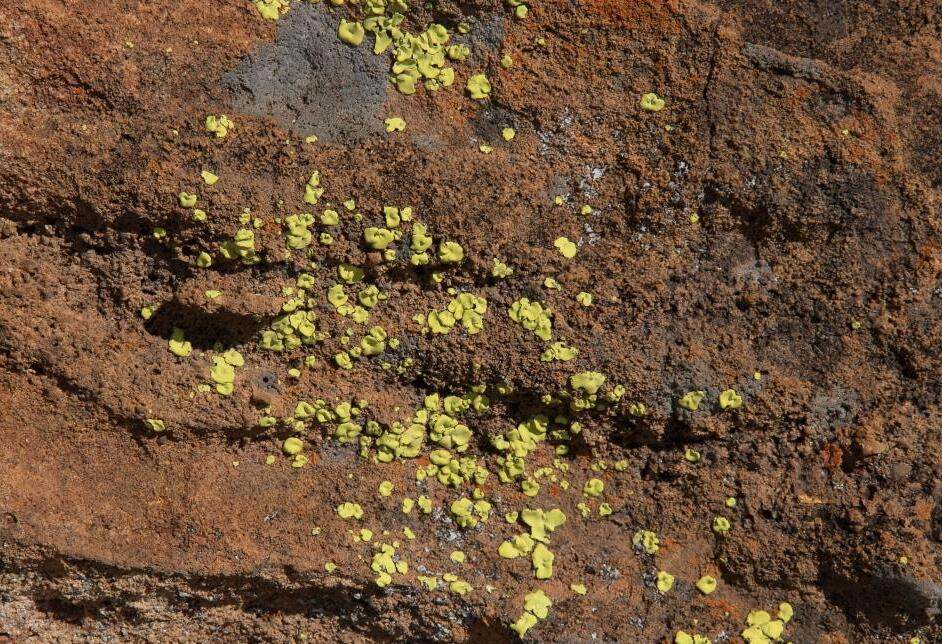
Dermatiscum thunbergii, a lichen on the rocks at Isalo National Park

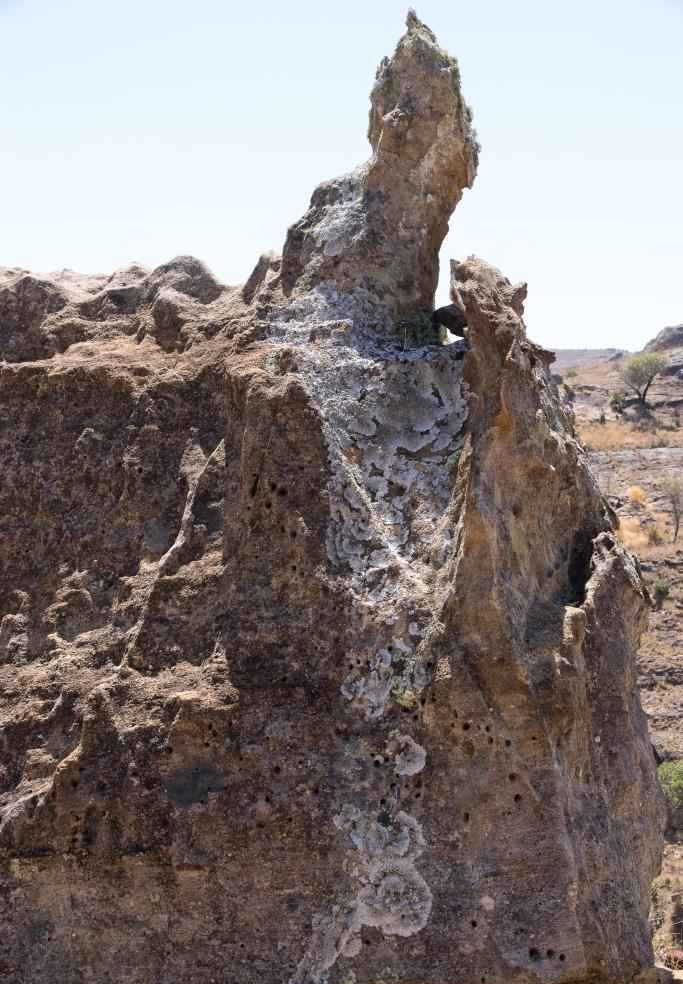
lichens growing on the rocks at Isalo National Park, Madagascar

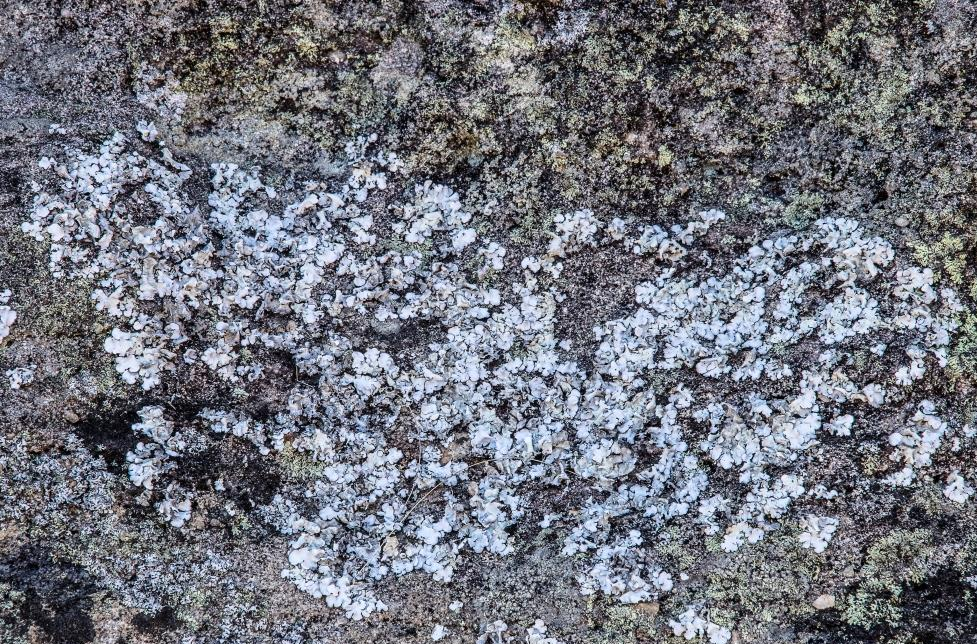
lichens growing on the rocks at Isalo National Park, Madagascar
