= Isalo National Park =

National park in Madagascar

- IUCN category II (national park)
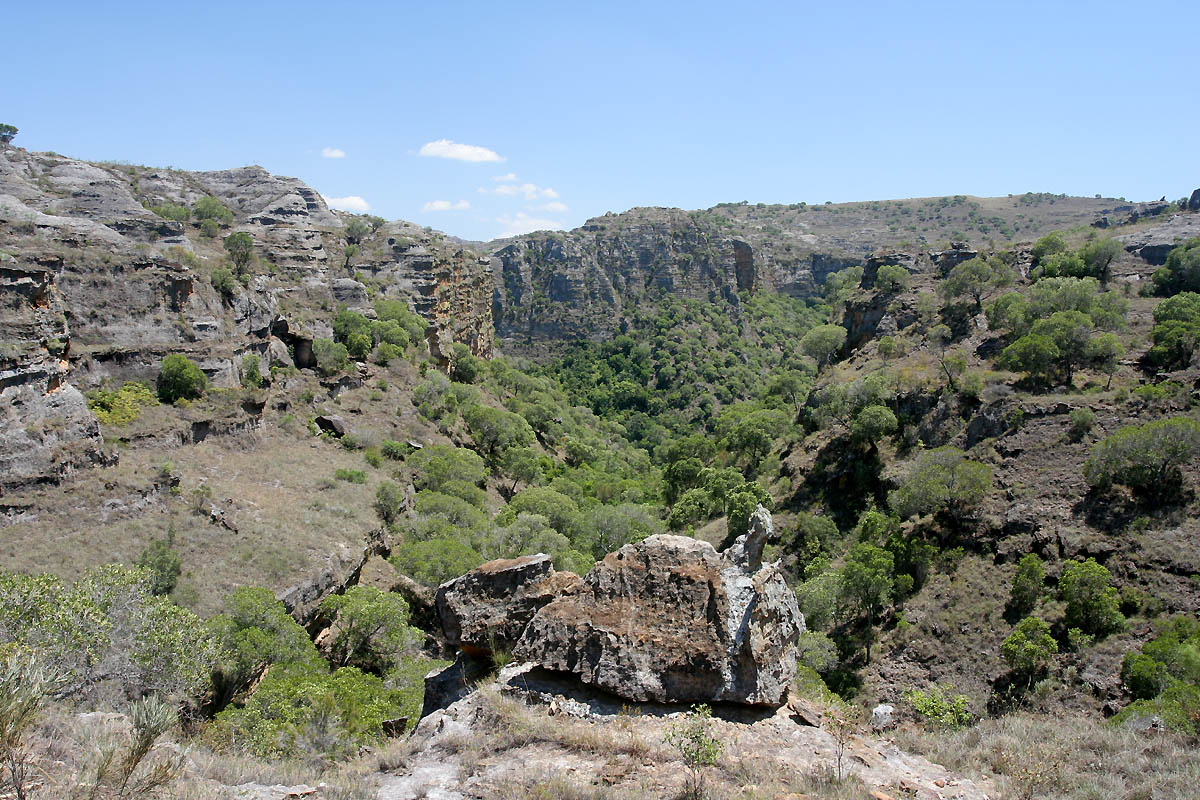
- Interactive map of Isalo National Park
- Location: Southwestern Madagascar
- Nearest city: Ranohira, Toliara and Ihosy
- Coordinates: 22°33.5′S 45°24.0′E
- Area: 815.40 km^{2} (314.83 mi^{2})
- Established: 1962
- Visitors: 32,714 (in 2011)
- Governing body: Madagascar National Parks Association (PNM-ANGAP)

Isalo National Park is a National Park in the Ihorombe Region of Madagascar, in the southwestern corner of the Province of Fianarantsoa. The closest town is Ranohira, and the closest cities are Toliara and Ihosy. It is a sandstone landscape that has been dissected by wind and water erosion into rocky outcrops, plateaus, extensive plains and up to 200 m (660 ft) deep canyons. There are permanent rivers and streams as well as many seasonal watercourses. Elevation varies between 510 and 1,268 m (1,673 and 4,160 ft).

== History and significance ==
Isalo National Park was created in 1962 and has been administered by the Madagascar National Parks authority since 1997. The Bara people have traditionally inhabited this area, a nomadic people subsisting on cattle (zebu) farming. There are burial sites of the Bara people and some older burial sites of the Sakalava.

Isalo is primarily within the dry deciduous forests ecoregion, an ecoregion in which natural vegetation has been reduced by almost 40% of its original extent. It also includes landscapes considered part of the subhumid forests ecoregion, an ecoregion that is home to numerous endemic species and has been given Critical/Endangered status because only small areas of native habitat remain and most of those are highly fragmented. The woodlands of Isalo are dominated by the endemic tree tapia (Uapaca bojeri). This is a woodland type that is restricted in distribution; found only in Madagascar's central highlands. Some of the largest intact areas of tapia woodlands are found in Isalo. There are numerous narrowly endemic plant species found here, including 13 species that have been found only in Isalo and another 35 that are rare species, known from 2-5 sites. Not only is Sarcolaenaceae a plant family found only in Madagascar, two species within it (Sarcolaena isaloensis and Schizolaena isaloensis) have only been found in Isalo NP. There are also unusual lichens here, including the type specimen and only known location for the narrowly endemic Isalonactis madagascariensis.

== Climate ==
Isalo National Park is in the arid western part of Madagascar, within the western dry deciduous forest bioclimatic zone. The area has a hot, dry climate with two seasons; a cooler-drier season and a warmer-wetter season. Each lasts from 5–7 months. Temperatures range between 15–32 °C (15–32 °C), the average annual temperature is 21.8 °C (71.2 °F) and the average rainfall is 791 millimetres (31.1 inches) (at Ranohira). Precipitation is lowest in June, averaging 2 mm (0.079 in). December thru February are typically the wettest months. Rainfall in January averages 199 millimetres (7.8 inches), but the 2018/2019 wet season saw heavy rainfall, with 526 mm (20.7 in) of rain falling in January alone.

== Geology ==
Located in the southern part of the Morondava Basin, the sedimentary Isalo Group is the main geological formation of the park, forming the Isalo Massif. The group is up to 6,000m thick, of Triassic to early Jurassic origin and made up of coarse-grained sandstone deposited by braided streams. The Isalo Massif has been eroded by wind and water, resulting in deep canyons, sandstone domes, flat-topped mountains and "runiform" mountains - steep sided outcrops that have been dissected into odd-shapes. These odd shapes are referred to as "runiforme", based on the French word for "carved". A 2024 archaeological study of man-made rock-cut niches at a site called Teniky found them to be from the tenth to twelfth centuries CE, of possibly Zoroastrian provenance.

== Tourism ==
A local guide is required for visitors entering the park, and guides and porters can be hired in Ranohira. Treks in the park can last from several hours to a week or longer. The park includes several natural swimming pools which are popular among tourists, and are excellent sites to see the Benson's Rock Thrush. The main threat to this park comes from illegal wildfires set in the park. The wildfires limit the extent of forest and maximize grasslands used by cattle.

== Fauna ==
Fourteen species of mammals are reported for Isalo NP, including several different species of lemur.

List of lemur species found in Isalo National Park
Viewing time	Species
Daytime	Ring-tailed lemur (Lemur catta); Verreaux's sifaka (Propithecus verreauxi); Red-fronted lemur (Eulemur rufifrons)
Nighttime	Gray mouse lemur (Microcebus murinus); Red-tailed sportive lemur (Lepilemur ruficaudatus); Coquerel's giant mouse lemur (Mirza coquereli)

Over 100 species of bird have been found here, including Benson's rock thrush (Monticola sharpei bensoni), the knob-billed duck (Sarkidiornis melanotos), and the Madagascar ibis (Lophotibis cristata).

Twenty four amphibians and 47 reptiles have been documented in Isalo National Park, including a number of new “candidate” species. Species endemic to the Isalo area include four amphibians (Gephyromantis azzurrae, Mantella expectata, Mantidactylus noralottae, and the Malagasy rainbow frog (Scaphiophryne gottlebei) and one reptile species (Trachylepis nancycoutuae). Notable examples include the Madagascar ground boa (Acrantophis madagascariensis), Dumeril's boa (Acrantophis dumerili) and the white-lipped bright-eyed frog (Boophis albilabris).

== Flora ==
Botanical inventory of the Isalo region began with collections by Perrier de la Bâthie in 1910. Only 10 of the over 400 species that have been documented in Isalo are non-native species. Most (over 70%) are vascular plants that are endemic to Madagascar. There are 13 species that have been found only in Isalo and another 35 are rare species, known from 2-5 sites. The following table lists the species known only from Isalo NP.

Plant species found only in Isalo National Park
Family	Species
Apocynaceae	Cynanchum graminiforme
Apocynaceae	Cynanchum rauhianum
Asphodelaceae	Aloe isaloensis
Asteraceae	Helichrysum neoisalense
Dipterocarpaceae	Monotes madagascariensis
Fabaceae	Crotalaria isaloensis
Fabaceae	Kotschya perrieri
Fabaceae	Tephrosia isaloensis
Orobanchaceae	Radamaea latifolia
Podostemaceae	Thelethylax isalensis
Rubiaceae	Anthospermum longisepalum
Sarcolaenaceae	Sarcolaena isaloensis
Sarcolaenaceae	Schizolaena isaloensis

Some entire families of plants are endemic to Madagascar. Examples of three of these families can be found in Isalo; Asteropeiaceae, Sarcolaenaceae and Sphaerosepalaceae. Not only is Sarcolaenaceae a plant family found only in Madagascar, two species within it (Sarcolaena isaloensis and Schizolaena isaloensis) have only been found in Isalo NP.

== Lichens ==
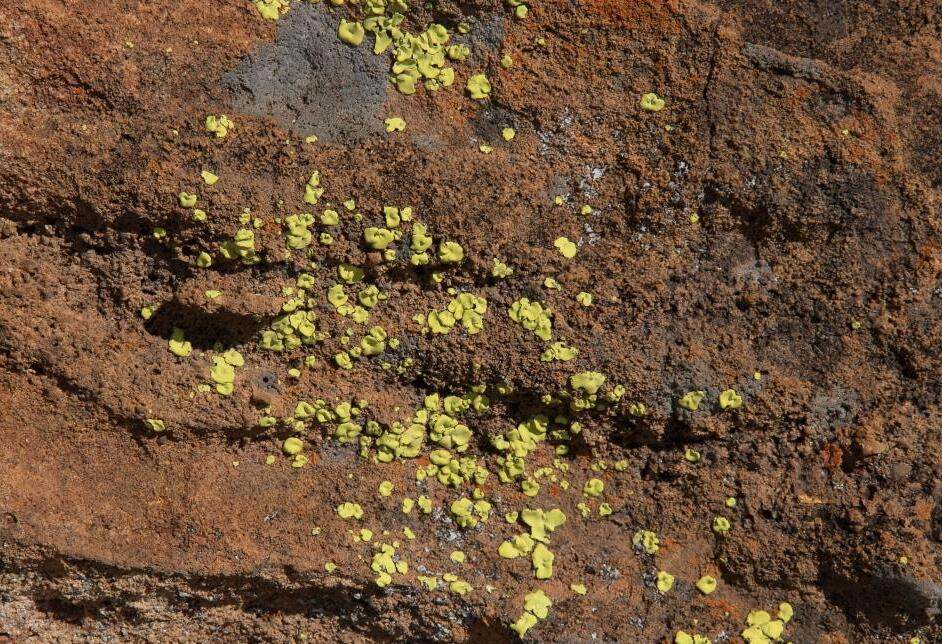
Dermatiscum thunbergii, a lichen on the rocks at Isalo National Park

The lichens of Madagascar are poorly known, but over 500 species have been documented. Only about 20 species are found in the dry areas of the country. Several of these have been documented in the Isalo area, including the type specimen and only known location for the narrowly endemic Isalonactis madagascariensis.

== Vegetation ==
Isalo is primarily within the dry deciduous forests ecoregion, an ecoregion in which natural vegetation has been reduced by almost 40% of its original extent. It also includes isolated forest patches classified as part of the subhumid forests ecoregion, an ecoregion that is home to numerous endemic species and has been given Critical/Endangered status because only small areas of native habitat remain and most of those are highly fragmented. Six main habitats have been described in Isalo NP.

=== 1. Sclerophylous woodlands ===
The sclerophyllous (hard-leafed, drought adapted) woodlands of Isalo are dominated by the endemic tree tapia (Uapaca bojeri). This is a woodland type that is restricted in distribution; found only in Madagascar's central highlands. Some of the largest intact areas of tapia woodlands are found in Isalo. These woodlands are adapted to regular burning and are characterized by a relatively open canopy dominated primarily by tapia, but other trees may include members of the family Euphorbiaceae or the endemic family Sarcolaenaceae. The main components of the shrub layer are made up of species from the families Asteraceae, Rubiaceae, and Leguminosae, but herbs and grasses form the main understory. Endemic Kalanchoe and Aloe species grow in this habitat.

=== 2. Evergreen humid forest ===
These forests are associated with moist habitats such as near streams or in the deep ravines. Native forests found in deep canyons have palm species (Ravenea and Dypsis species), Breonadia salicina, Pterophylla sp., Voacanga sp. and Dracaena sp. Some of these moist habitats however are now dominated by introduced species such as Melia azedarach, Mangifera indica or Eugenia sp.

=== 3. Pandanus thickets ===
Pandanus thickets, dominated by Pandanus pulcher occur associated with shallower valleys or small stream are where the forest is degraded and frequently burned.

=== 4. Dry (xerophytic) vegetation ===
This habitat is associated with dry rocky areas, including steep slopes and ridges. Although vegetation is sparse, a number of endemic species are found in these habitats, including Xerophyta sp., elephant's foot (Pachypodium rosulatum var. gracilius) and the narrow endemic Aloe isaloensis.

=== 5. Secondary shrub communities ===
Secondary shrub communities are found where the slopes of the Isalo Massif contact fields or pastures. The most common species in these communities are listed as: Mimosa latispinosa, Vangueria madagascariensis, Maesa lanceolata, Aphloia theaeformis, Crotalaria sp., and Tamarindus indica.

=== 6. Grasslands ===
Native grasslands, probably once restricted to small patches, are thought to have expanded as a result of intensive burning, primarily to facilitate cattle grazing. Grasslands (also called pseudo-steppes) are now widespread in Isalo, dominated by Aristida similis and Aristida rufescens as well as Trachypogon sp. or Heteropogon sp. Frequent burning maintains the grasslands and prevents tree regrowth.

== Gallery ==
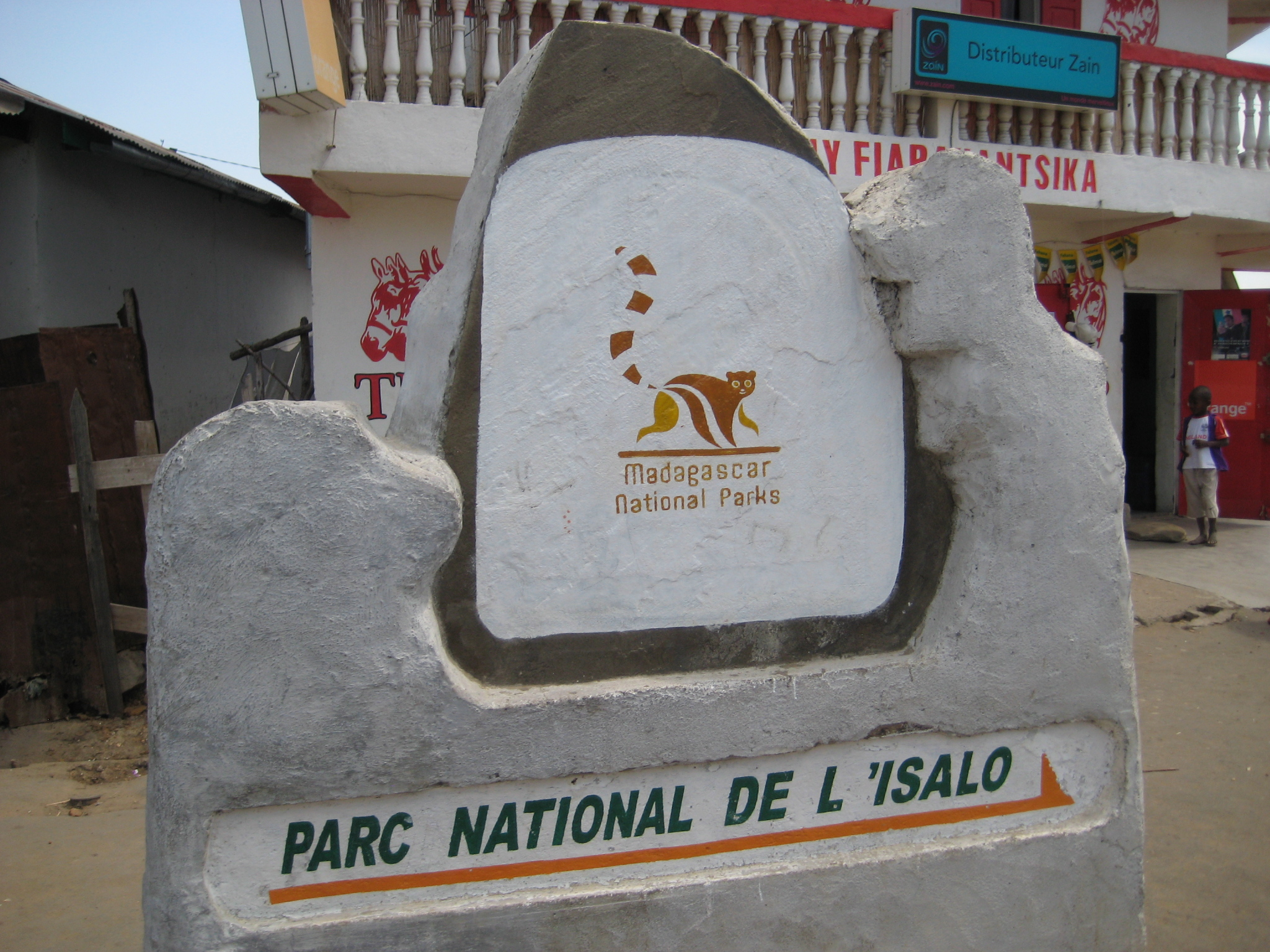
Sign for Isalo National Park

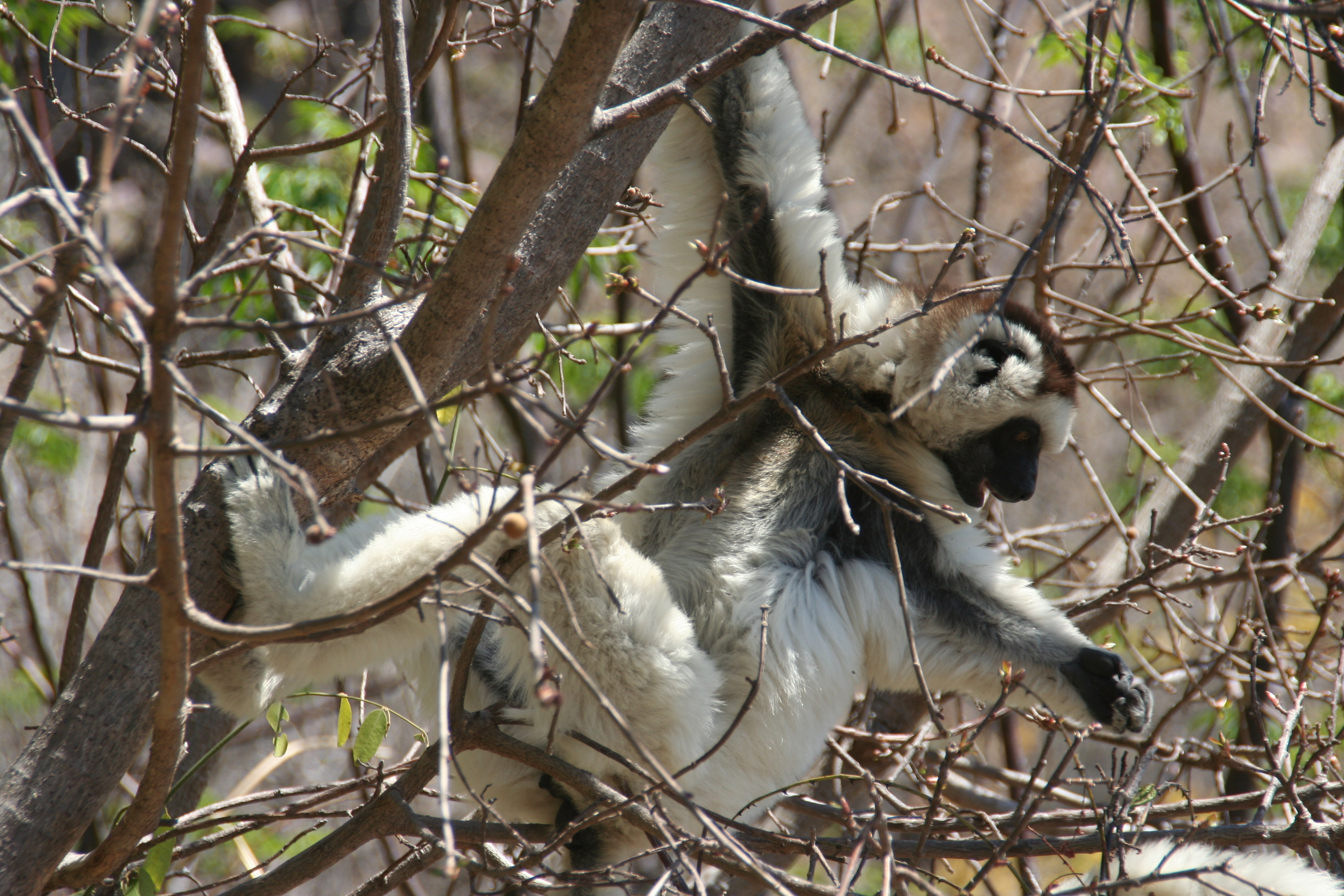
Verreaux's sifaka at Isalo National Park

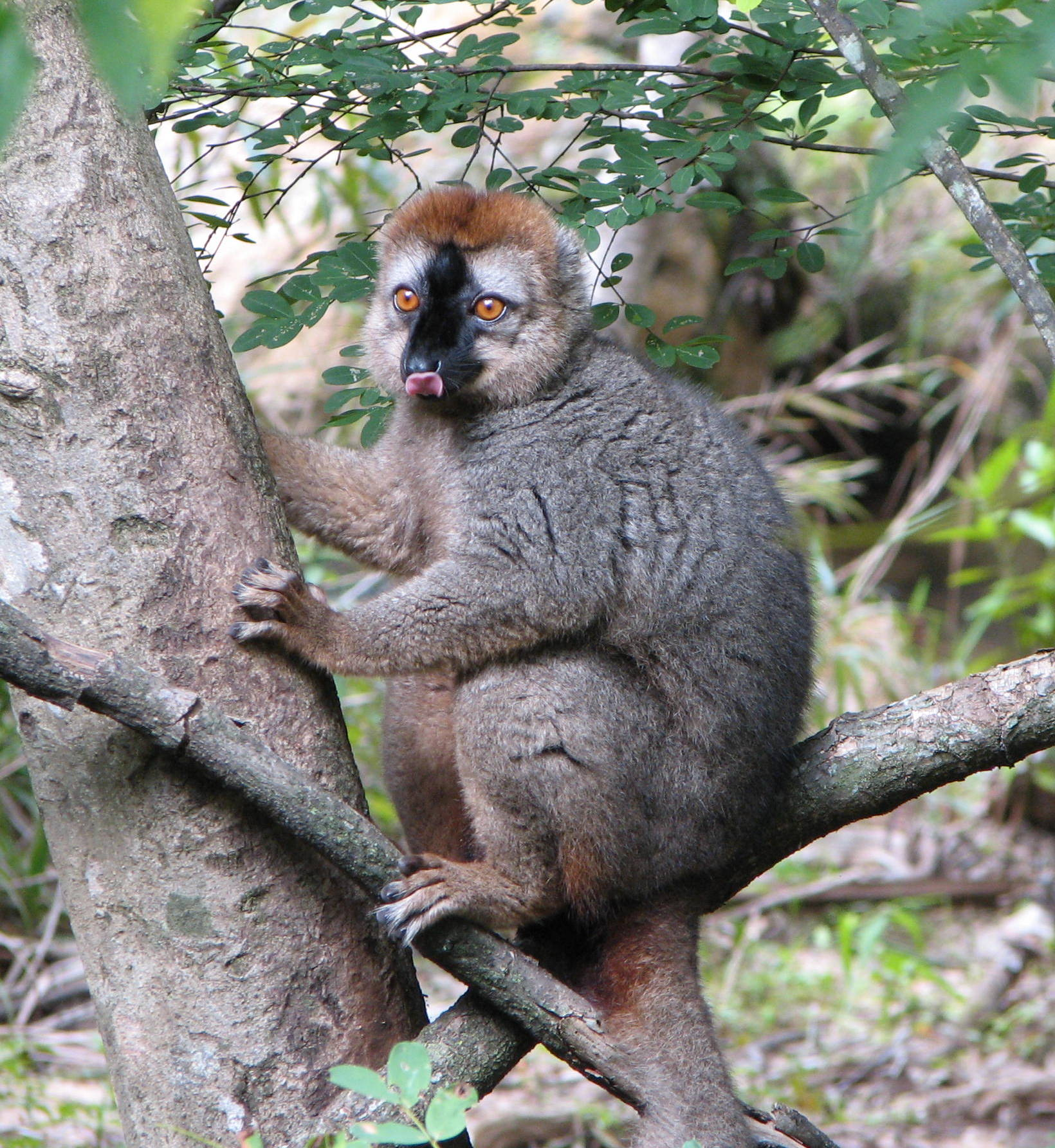
Red-fronted brown lemur at Isalo National Park

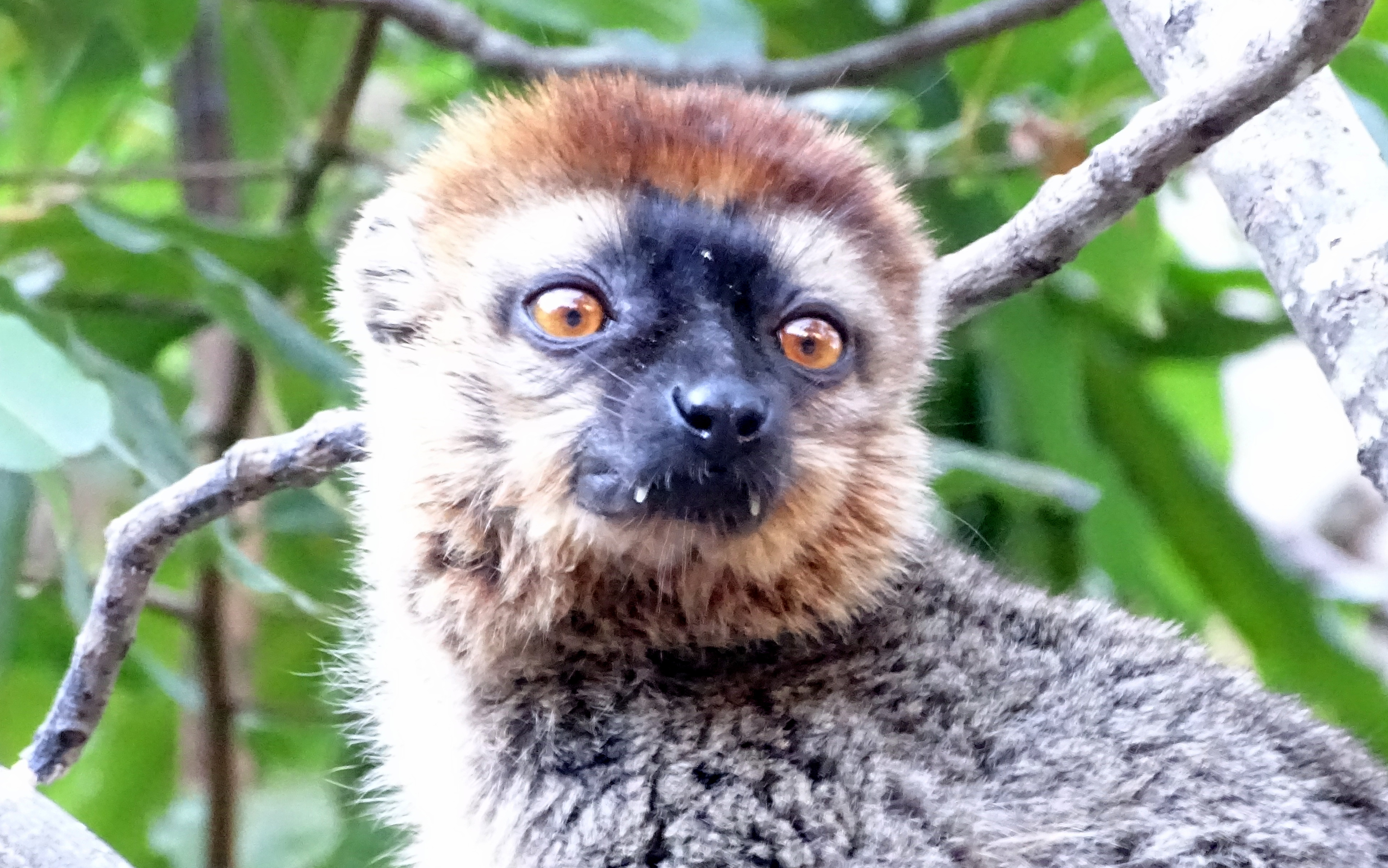
Red-fronted brown lemur showing fangs

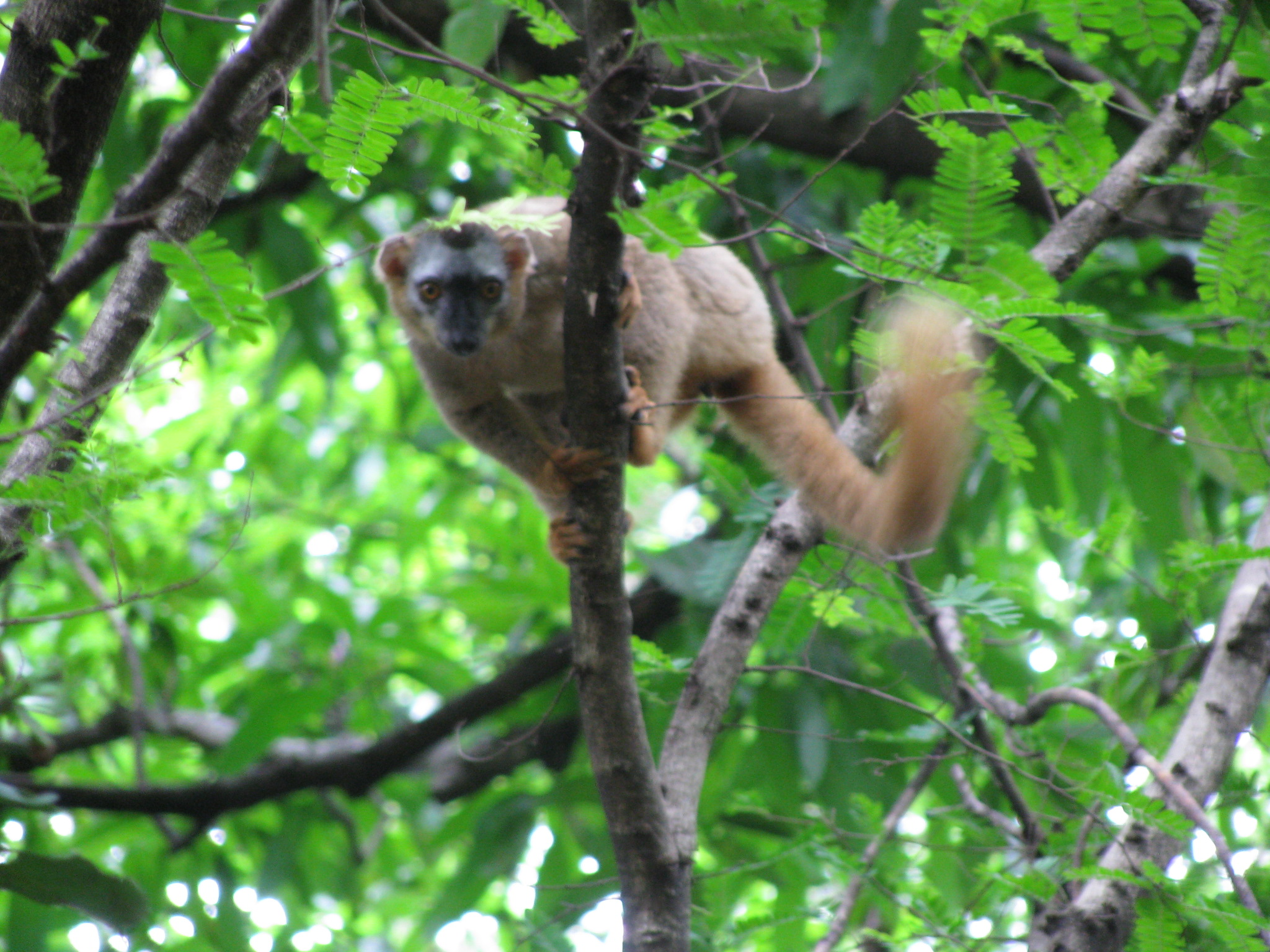
Red-fronted brown lemur

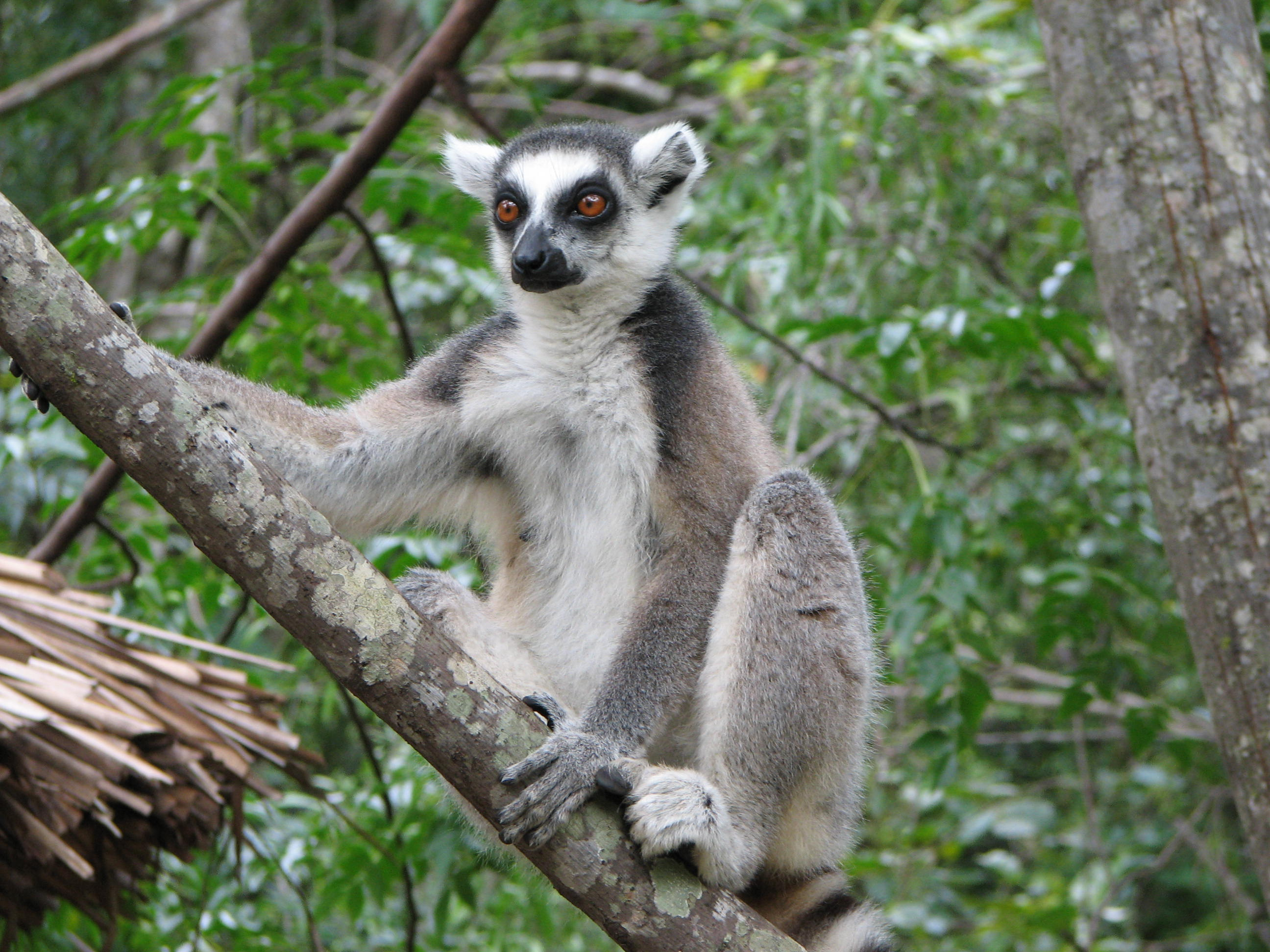
Lemur catta

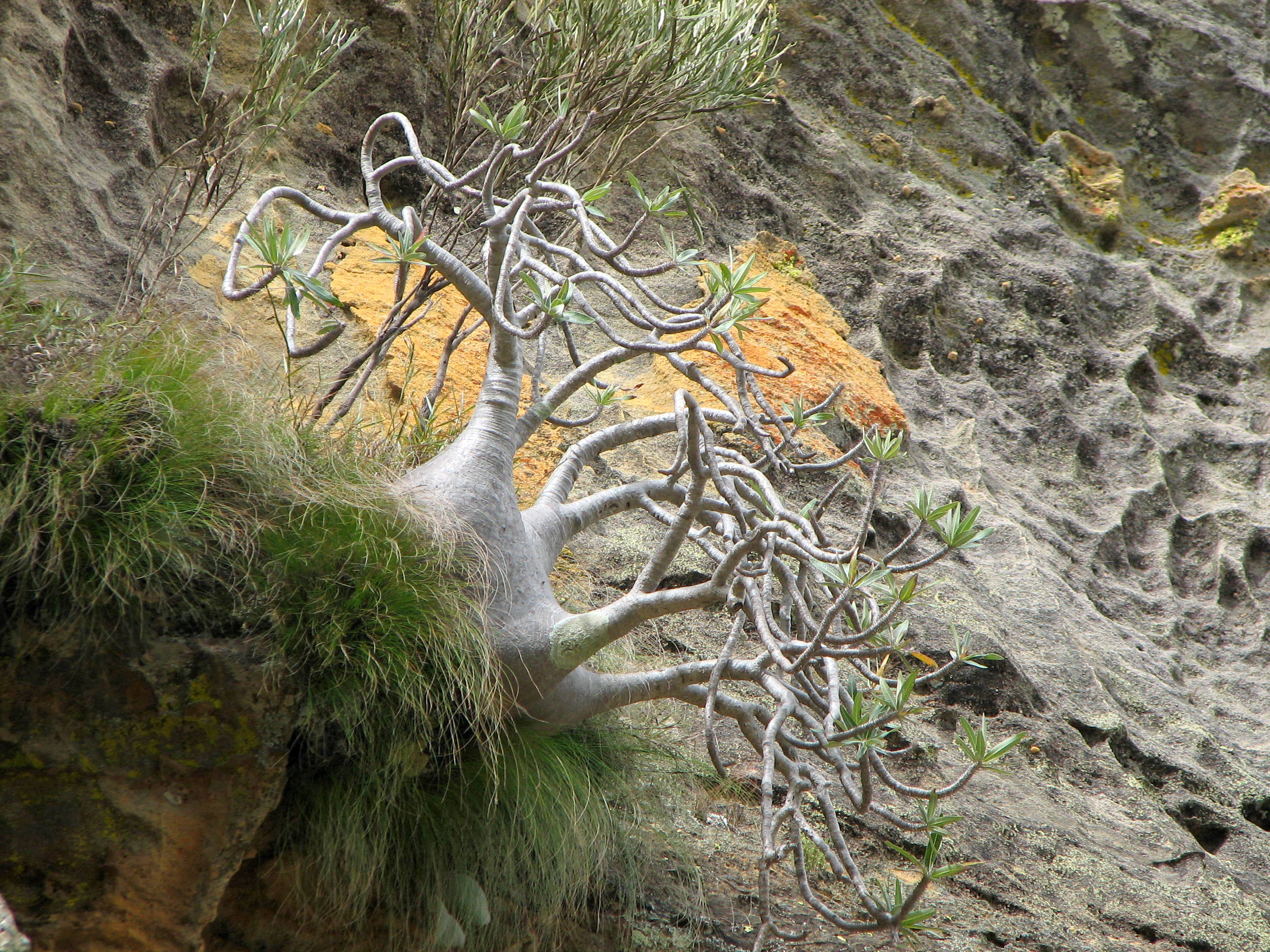
Pachypodium rosulatum gracilius

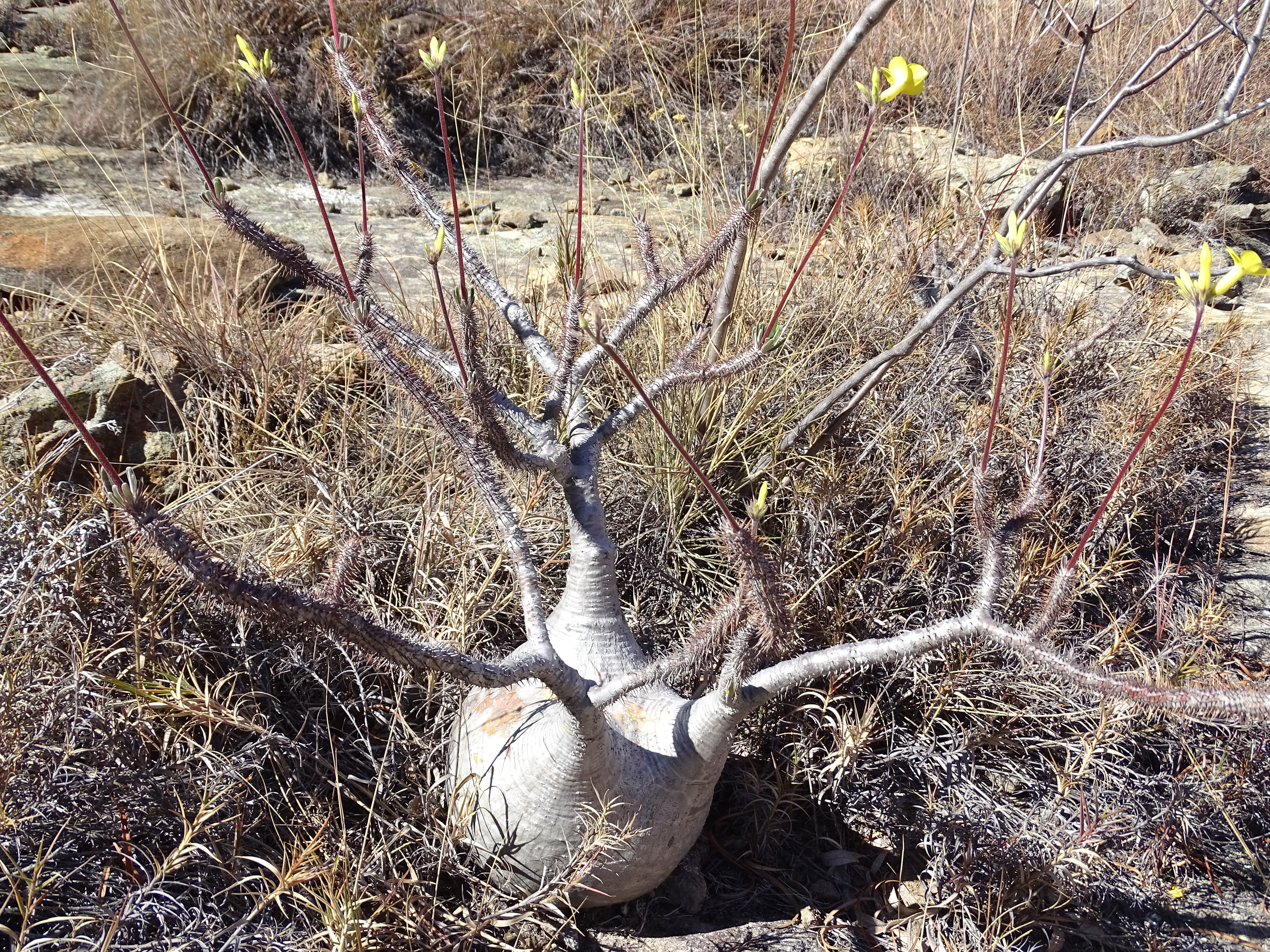
Elephants foot plant at Isalo National Park

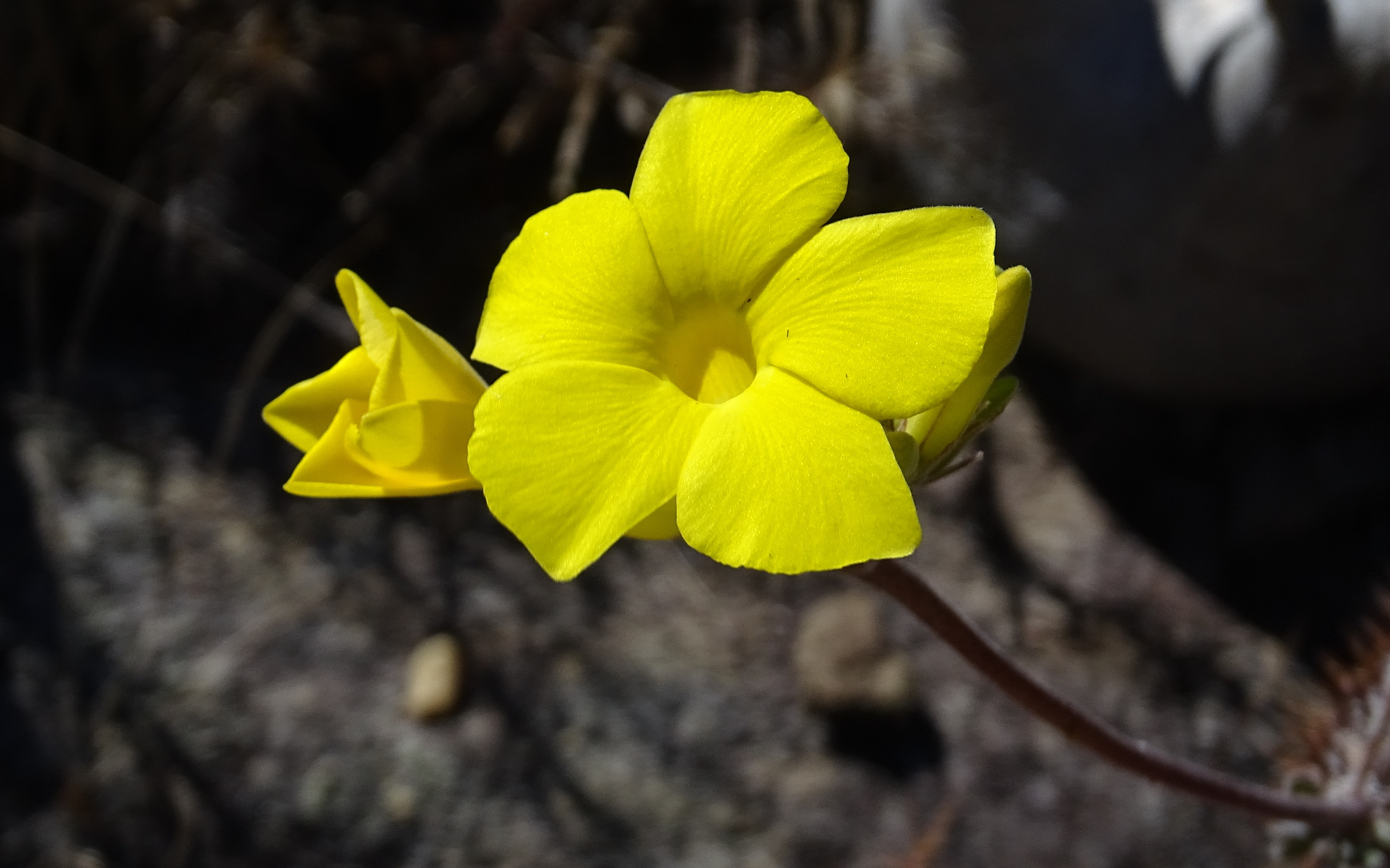
Elephants foot flower at Isalo National Park

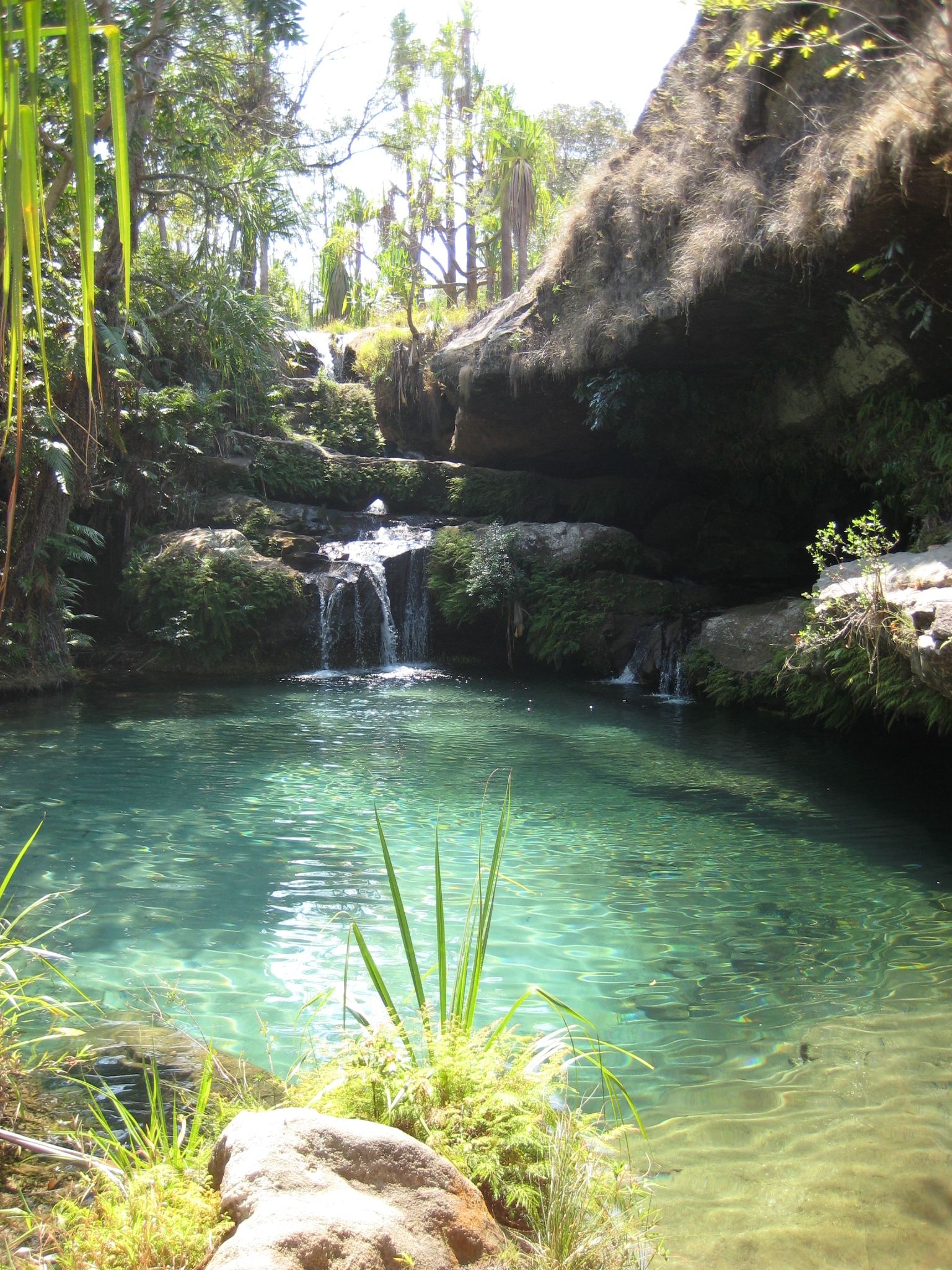
Waterfall and Piscine Naturelle

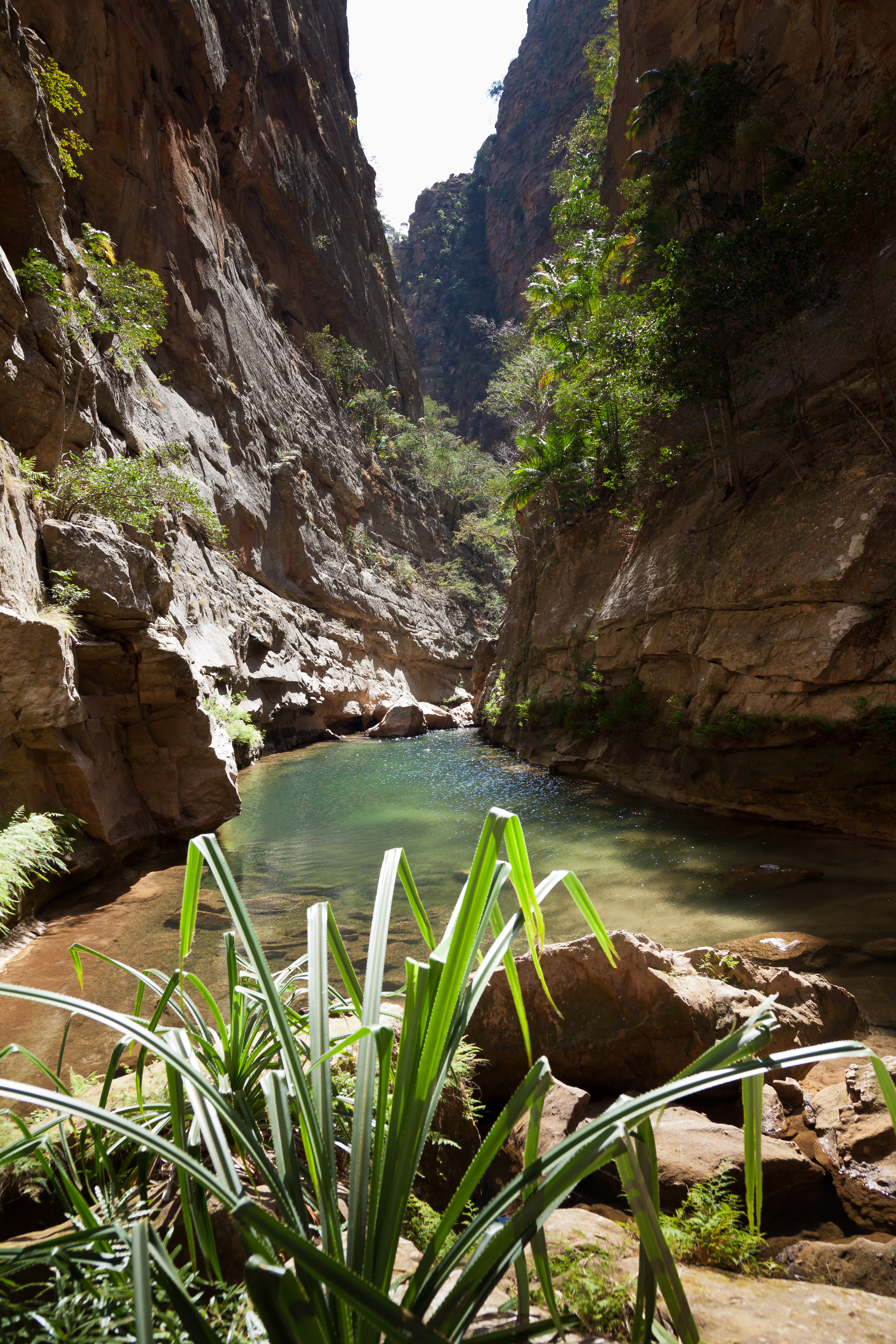
Canyon des Makis

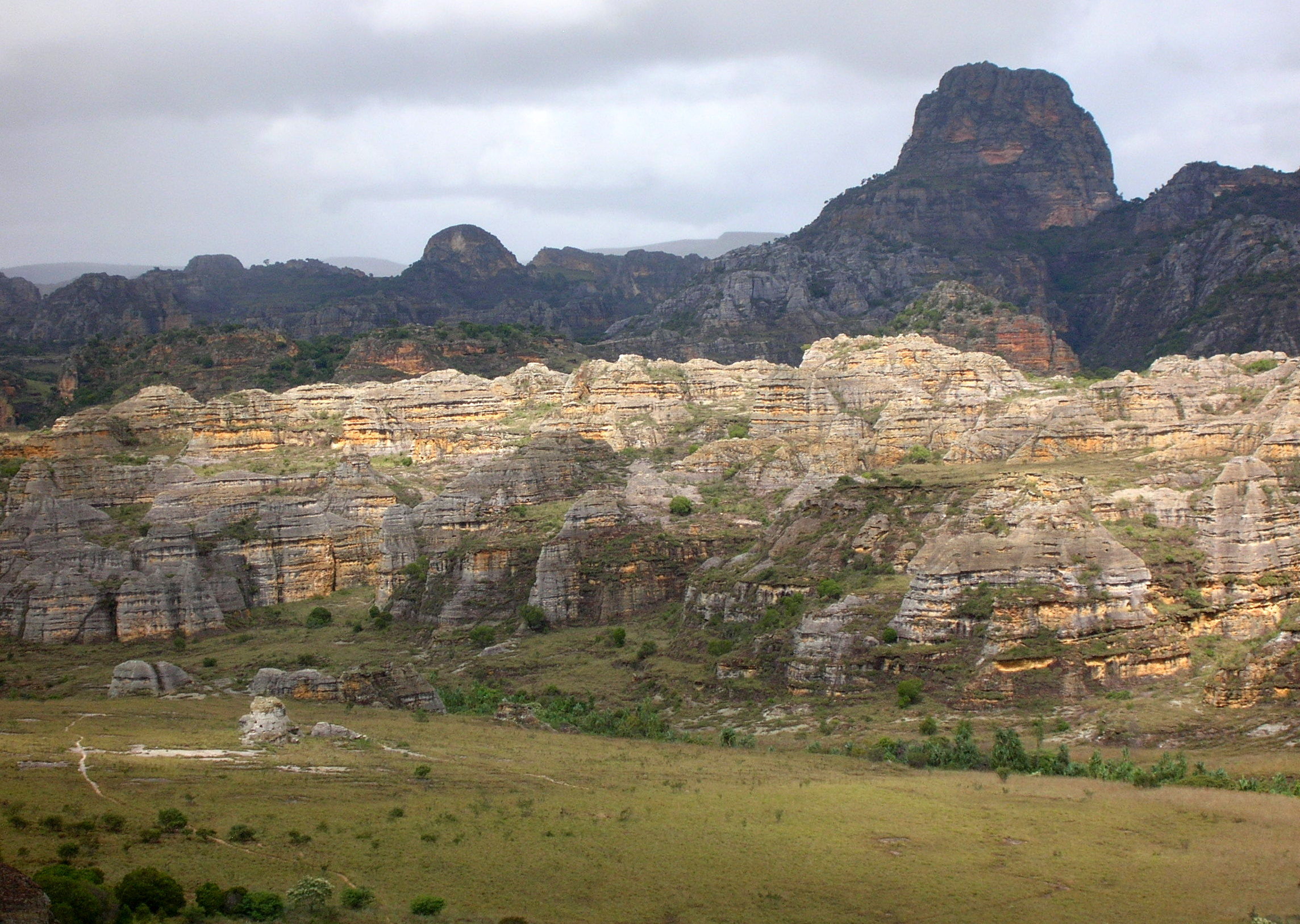
Lush and arid landscape

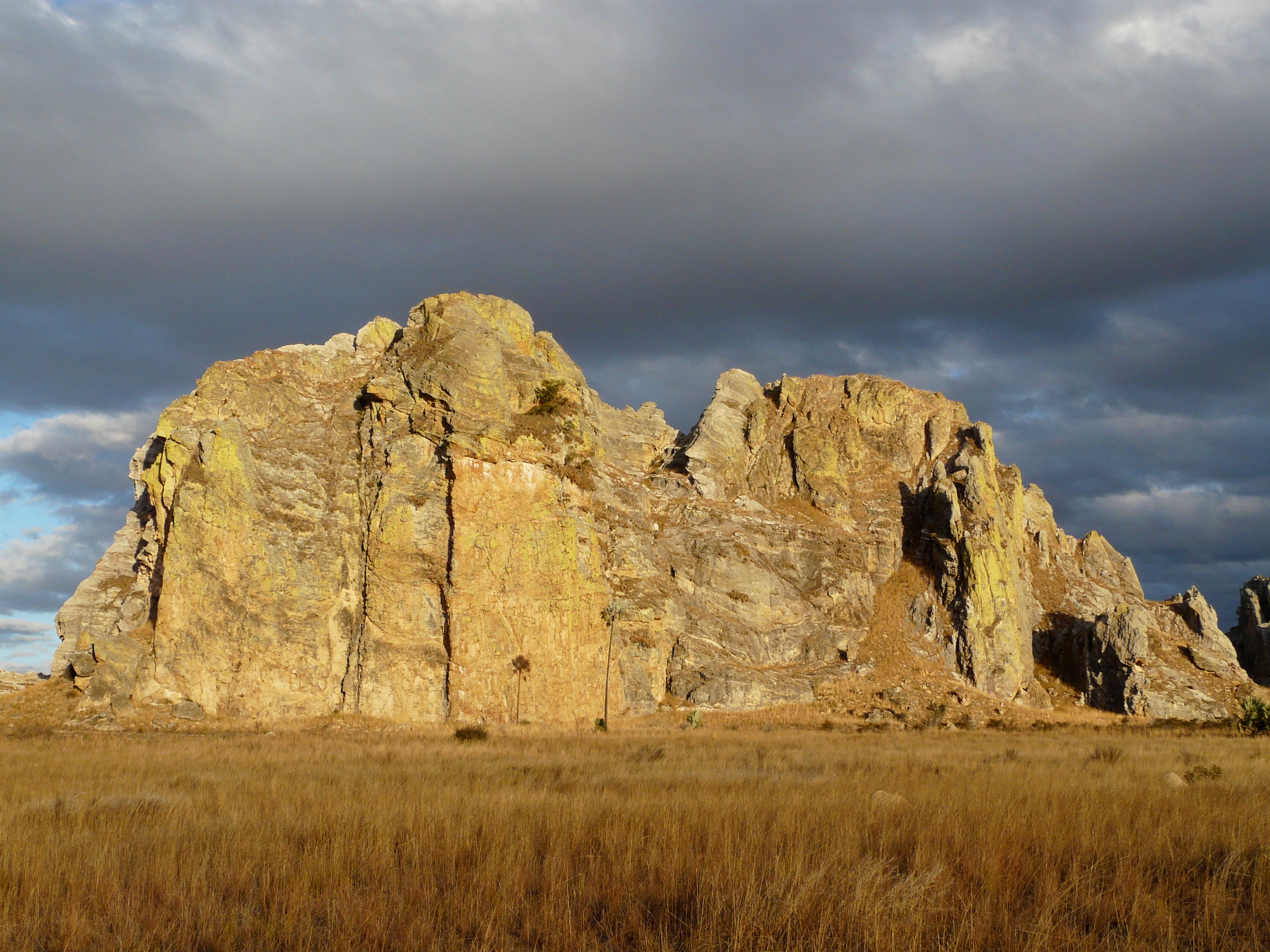
Eroded Rock formations at Isalo National Park

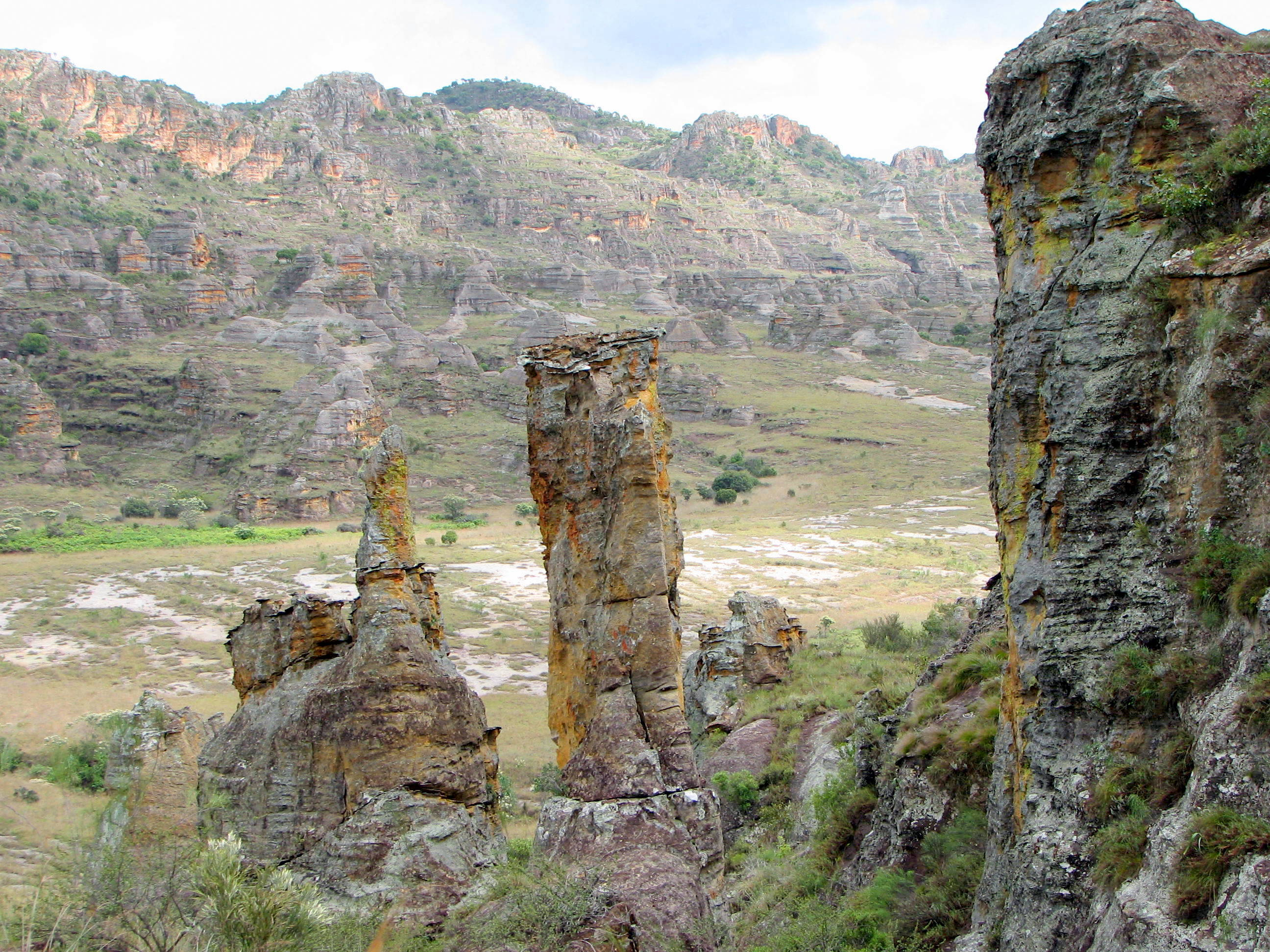
Standing Stones at Isalo National Park

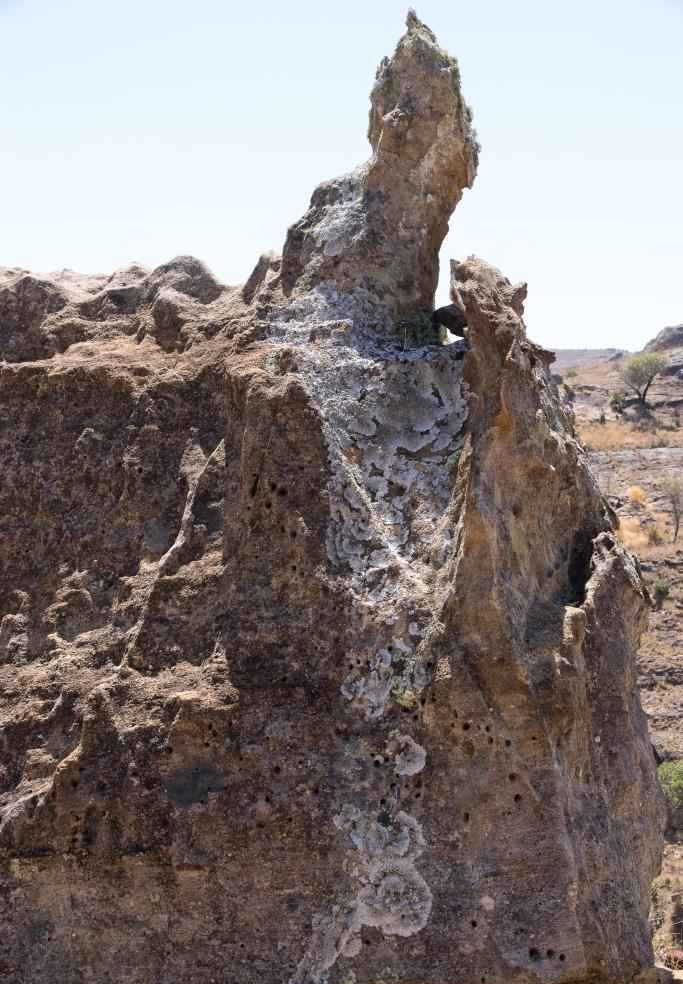
lichens growing on the rocks at Isalo

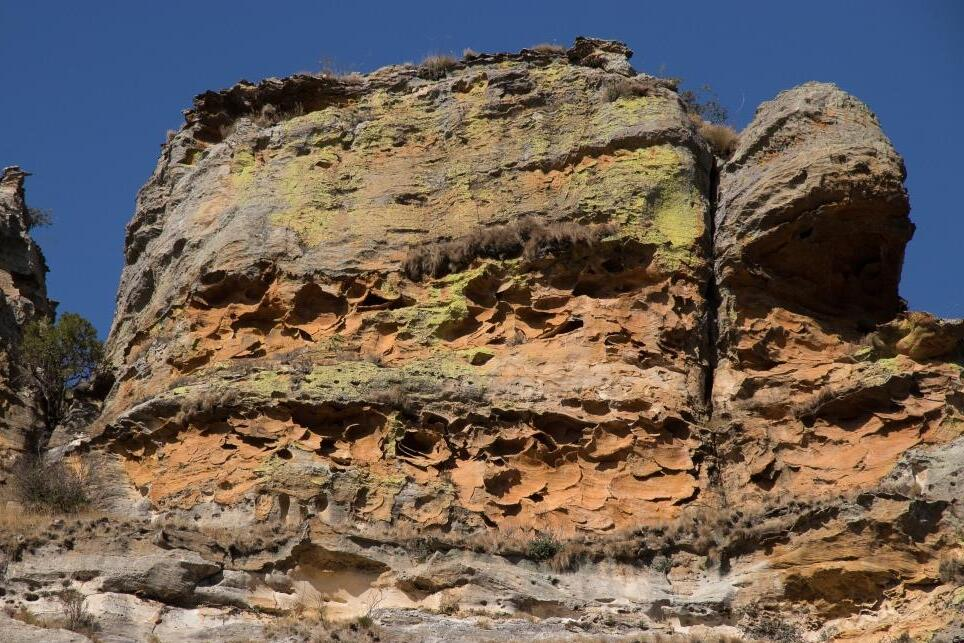
lichens growing on the rocks at Isalo National Park, Madagascar including Dermatiscum thunbergii

== See also ==
- List of national parks of Madagascar
