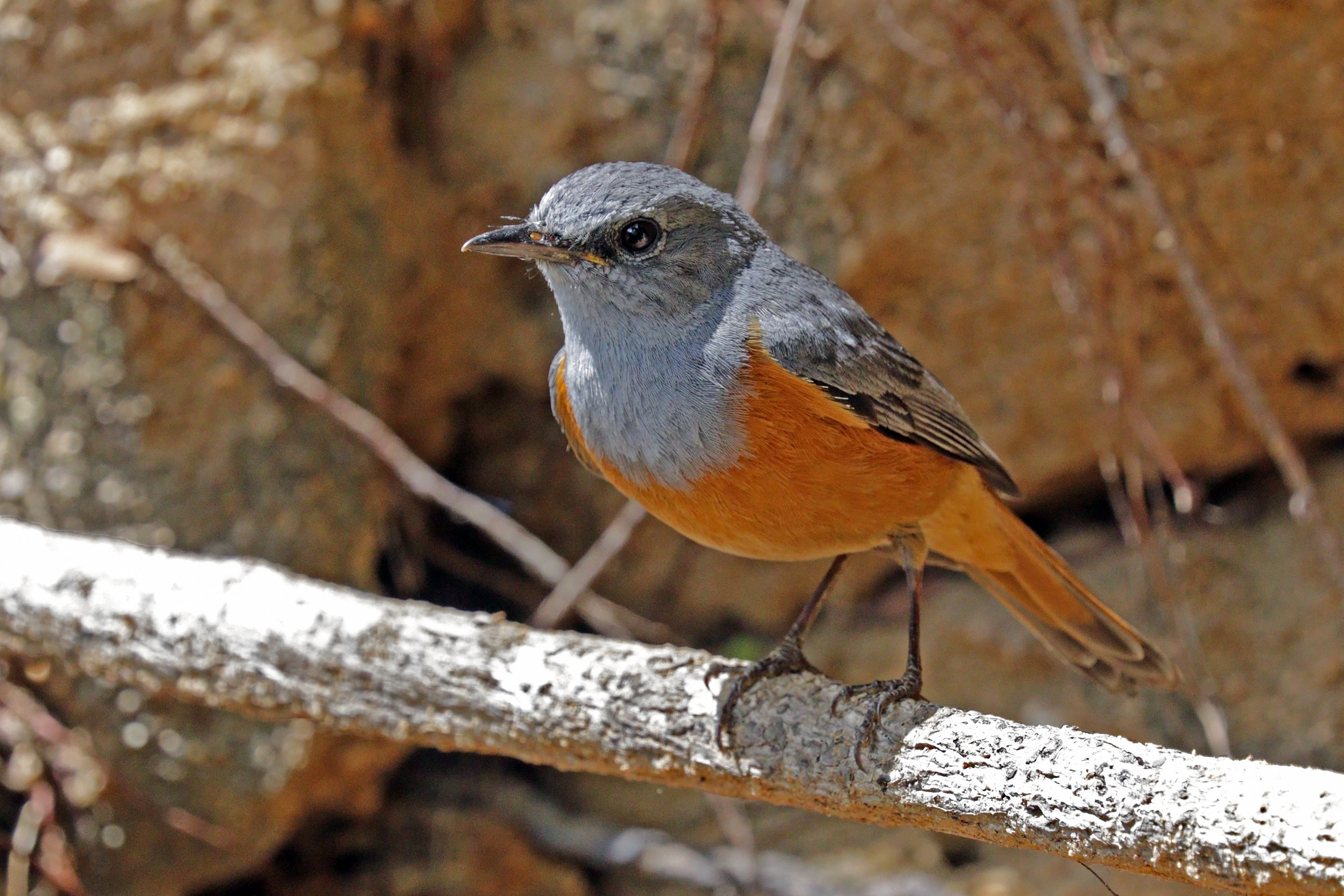
- Male, Isalo National Park
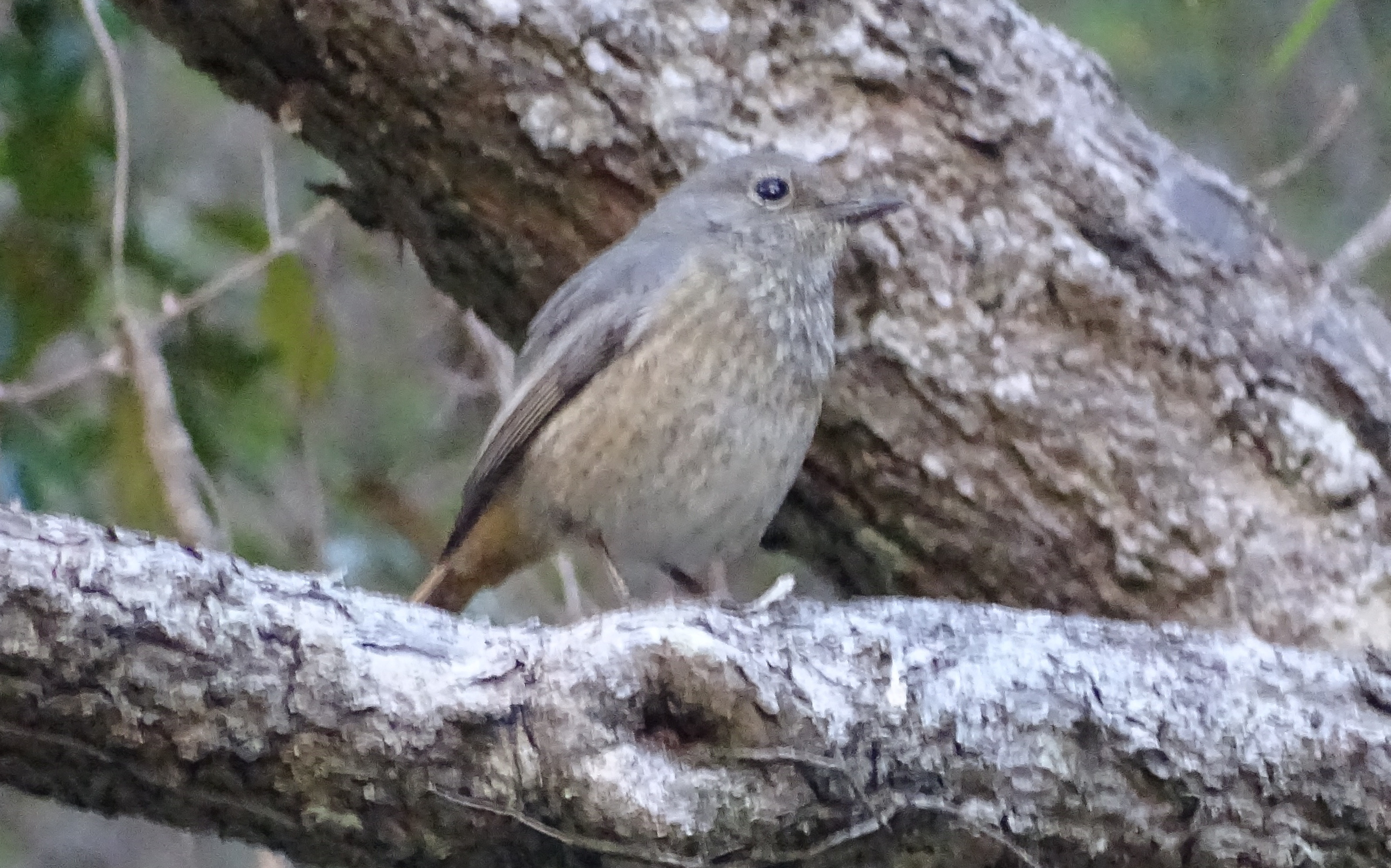
- Female

Scientific classification
- Kingdom: Animalia
- Phylum: Chordata
- Class: Aves
- Order: Passeriformes
- Family: Muscicapidae
- Genus: Monticola
- Species: M. sharpei
- Subspecies: M. s. bensoni

Trinomial name
- Monticola sharpei bensoni (Farkas, 1971)

Synonyms
- Pseudocossyphus bensoni

= Benson's rock thrush =

Subspecies of bird

Benson's rock thrush (Monticola sharpei bensoni) is a songbird in the family Muscicapidae, formerly placed in the Turdidae together with the other chats. It is usually included in the forest rock thrush (M. sharpei) as a subspecies; e.g. BirdLife International revised its status to subspecies in 2008., however it was recognized as a distinct species at one time.

This bird is endemic to Madagascar. Its natural habitats are subtropical or tropical dry forests and subtropical or tropical dry shrubland. It is becoming rare due to habitat loss; when it was still considered a good species, it was classified as Near threatened by the IUCN.

== Description ==
The male has a blue head, mantle, back, wings and upper parts of the breast contrasting with an orange lower part of the breast and the belly. The female has a brown back, wings and tail and pale underparts, mottled and streaked with bold brown markings. In both sexes, the base of the outer tail feathers is orange. Males can often be detected by their song - "toee toee toee" issuing from the lower parts of the tree canopy.

== Distribution and habitat ==
This species is endemic to Madagascar and is found in the tropical forests. In the north of the island it is usually found in mid- and high-altitude rainforests, in forest fringes and adjacent scrubby areas. In the south it inhabits dry forests and semi-arid rocky areas. It appears to be able to recolonise burnt areas when the flora regrows.

== Conservation ==
The IUCN lists this species as being of "Least Concern". The population may be declining slightly but the bird seems to be fairly common. The main threats it faces are habitat degradation due to forest clearance for agricultural development, commercial logging, mining for sapphires and the increased frequency of fires.

== Footnotes ==
- Cruaud, A., M.J. Raherilalao, E. Pasquet, and S.M. Goodman. 2011. Phylogeography and systematics of the Malagasy rock-thrushes (Muscicapidae, Monticola). Zoologica Scripta 40: 554–566
