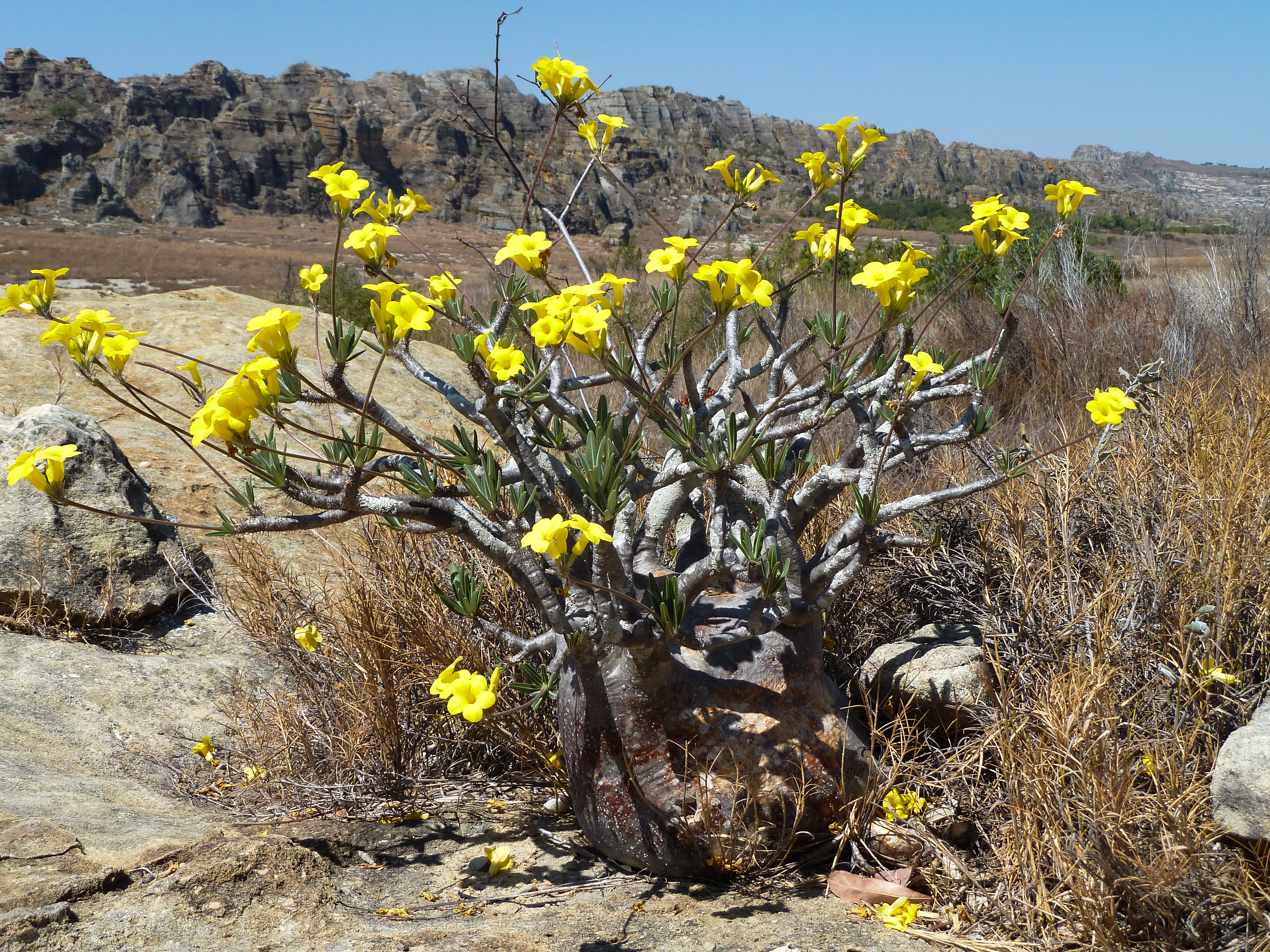
- P. rosulatum in Isalo N. P., Madagascar

Scientific classification
- Kingdom: Plantae
- Clade: Tracheophytes
- Clade: Angiosperms
- Clade: Eudicots
- Clade: Asterids
- Order: Gentianales
- Family: Apocynaceae
- Genus: Pachypodium
- Species: P. rosulatum

Binomial name
- Pachypodium rosulatum Baker 1882

Synonyms
- Pachypodium cactipes K. Schum. 1895.; Pachypodium drakei Costantin & Bois; Pachypodium rosulatum drakei (Costantin & Bois ) Marckgr.

= Pachypodium rosulatum =

Species of flowering plant

Pachypodium rosulatum, common name elephant's foot plant, belongs to the family Apocynaceae.

== Description ==
Pachypodium rosulatum is a shrubby perennial caudiciform plant with a bottle-shaped trunk, brownish silver and almost spineless, about 10–15 centimetres (3.9–5.9 in) wide and about 20–35 centimetres (7.9–13.8 in) tall. From the caudex depart many thorny cylindrical arms, forming a shrub about 1.5 metres (4 ft 11 in) tall. The leaves, which fall in the dry season, form a rosette on the top of branches. They are deciduous, dark green, oblanceolate, ovate or elliptical and petiolated. The long-stalked flowers are sulphur-yellow and form an inflorescence about 30 centimetres (12 in) high. Flowering period extends from February through May. The fruits are 6 to 20 inches long and contain elongated seeds with a length of 6 mm.

== Distribution ==
This plant is native to Madagascar and it is widespread on the central plateau.

== Habitat ==
These plants prefer sunny and stony areas. The succulent caudex and the underground tuberous enable the plant to tolerate long periods of drought.

== Gallery ==
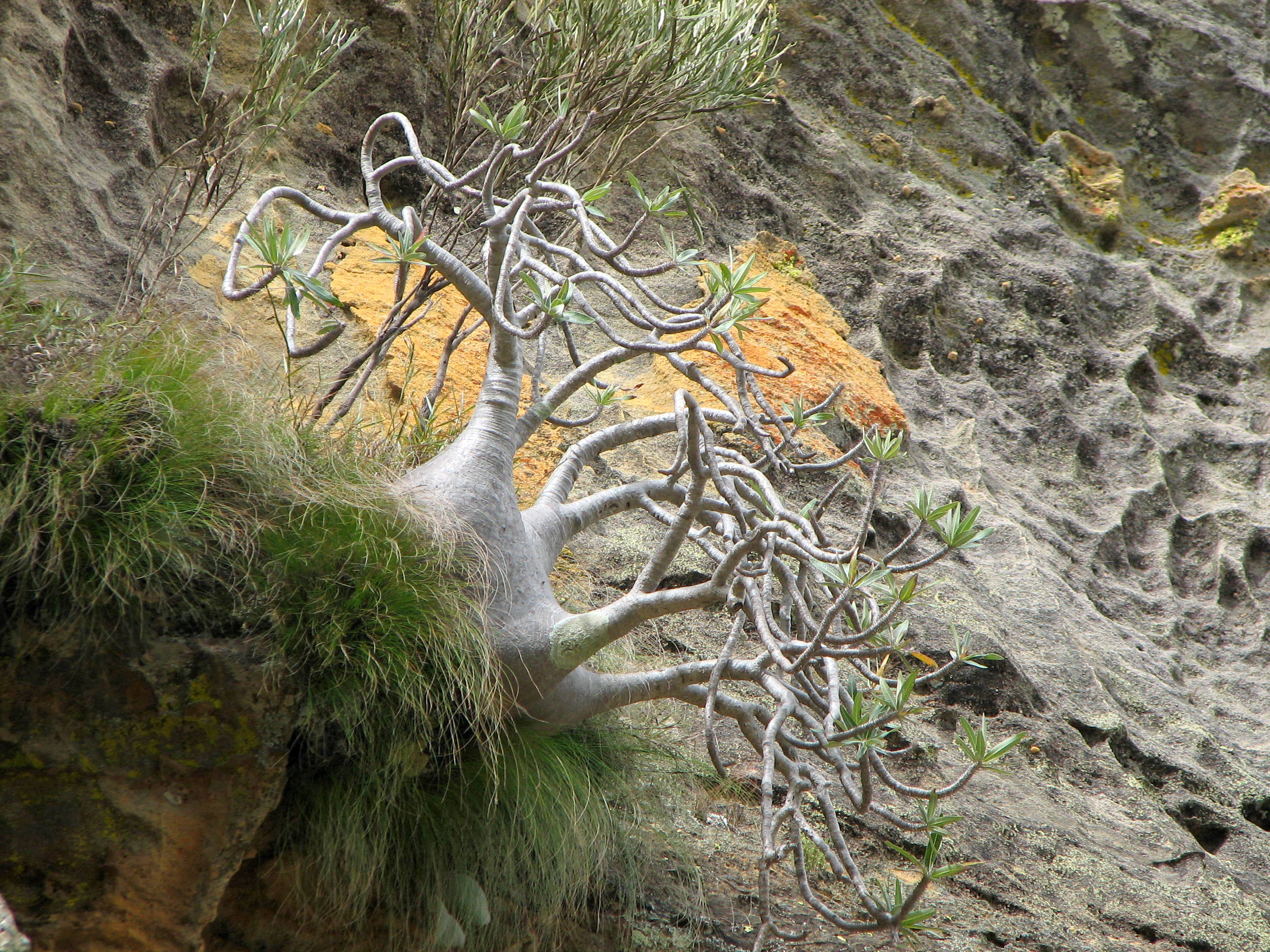
Pachypodium rosulatum subsp. gracilius in Isalo N. P., Madagascar

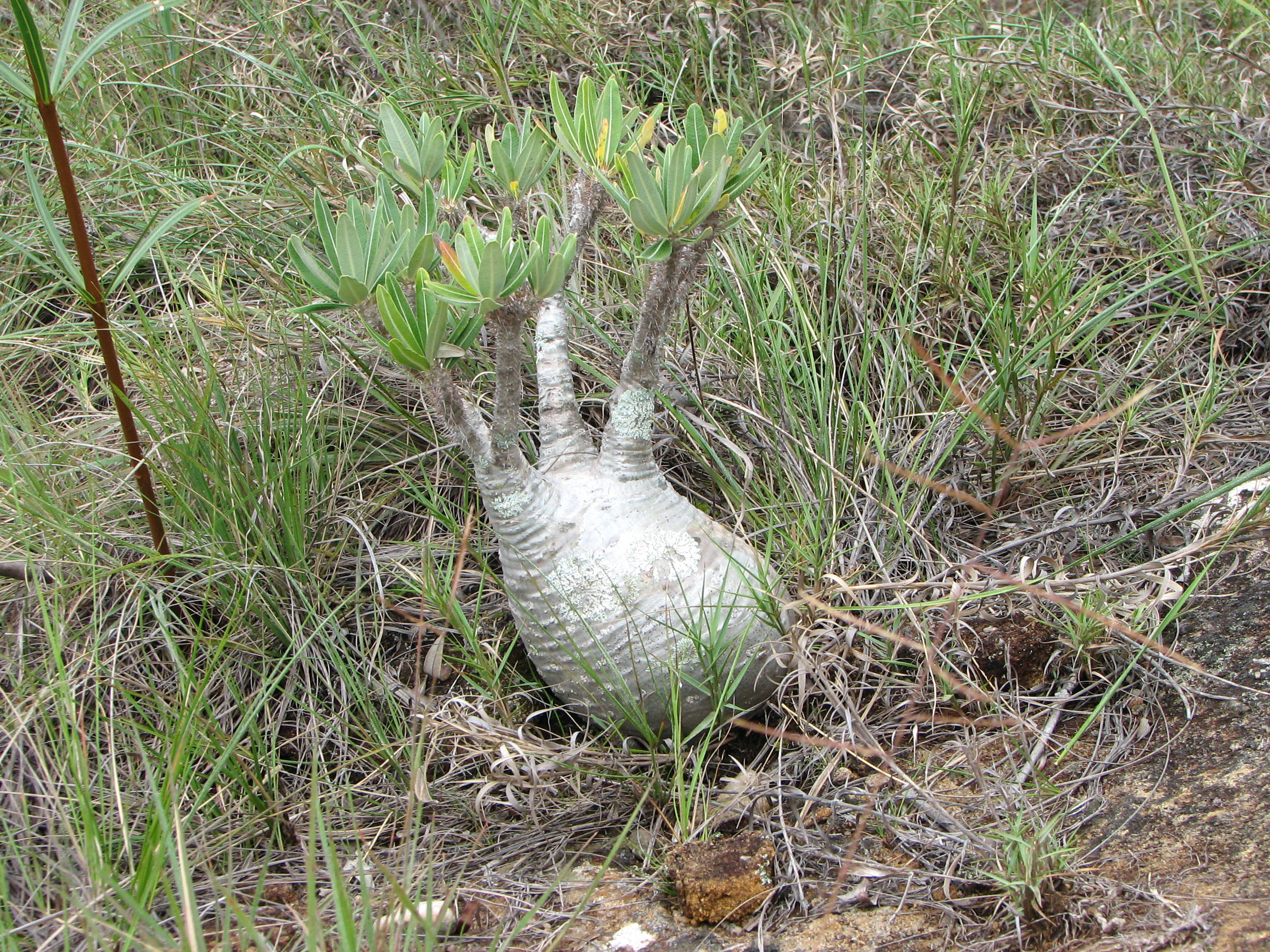
Pachypodium rosulatum subsp. gracilius in Isalo N. P., Madagascar

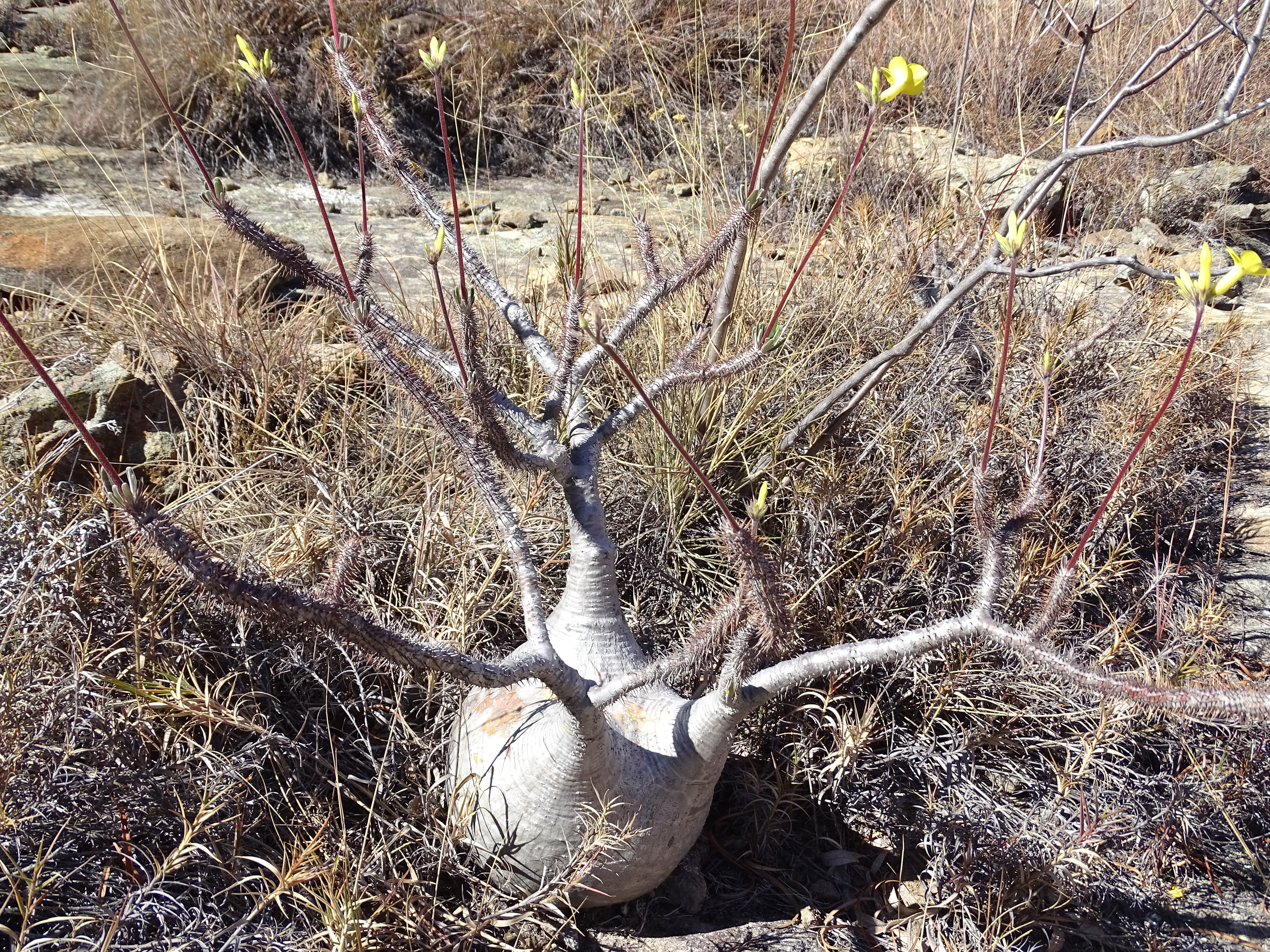
Elephant's foot in flower in Isalo N. P., Madagascar

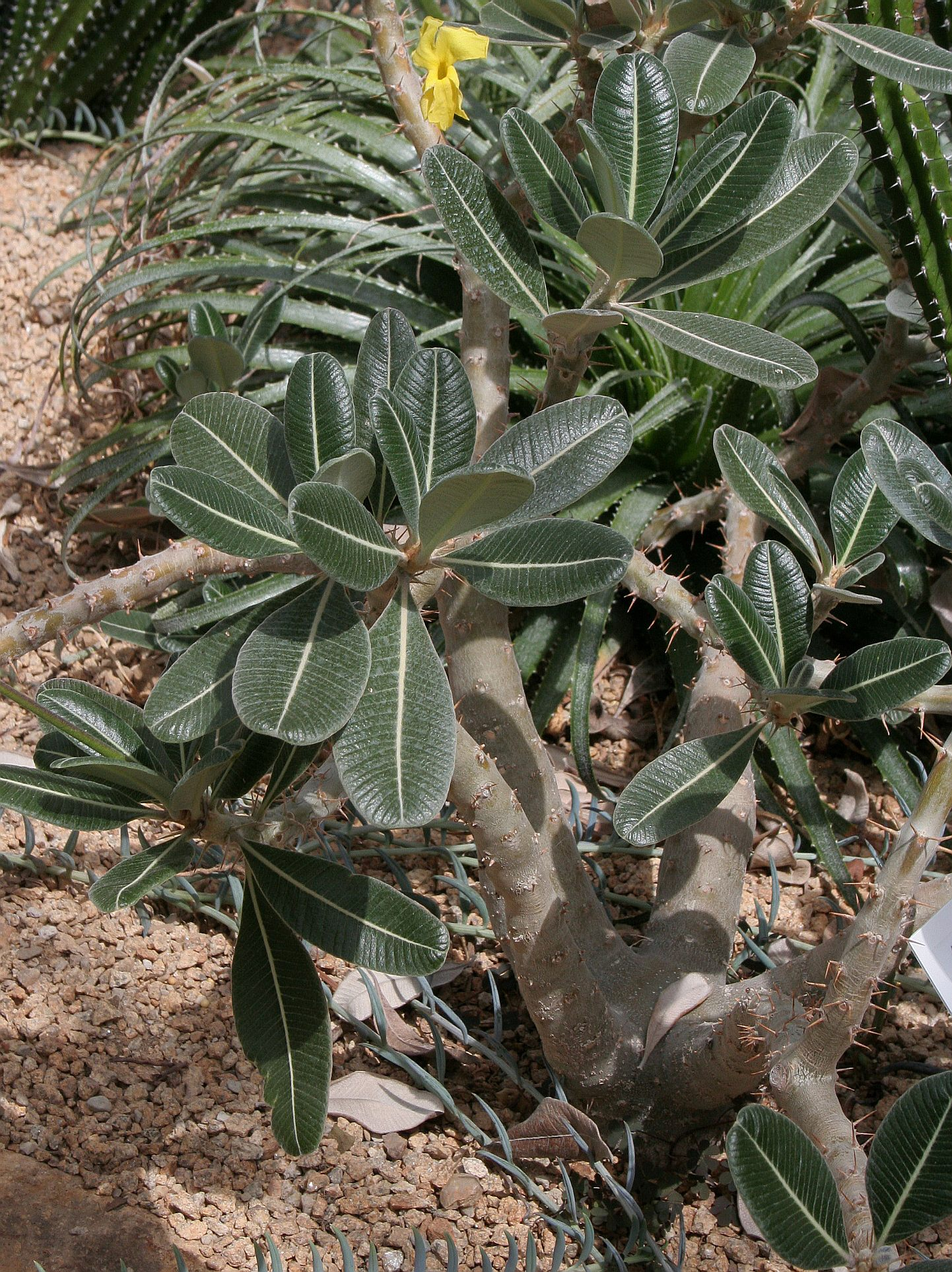
Foliage of P. rosulatum

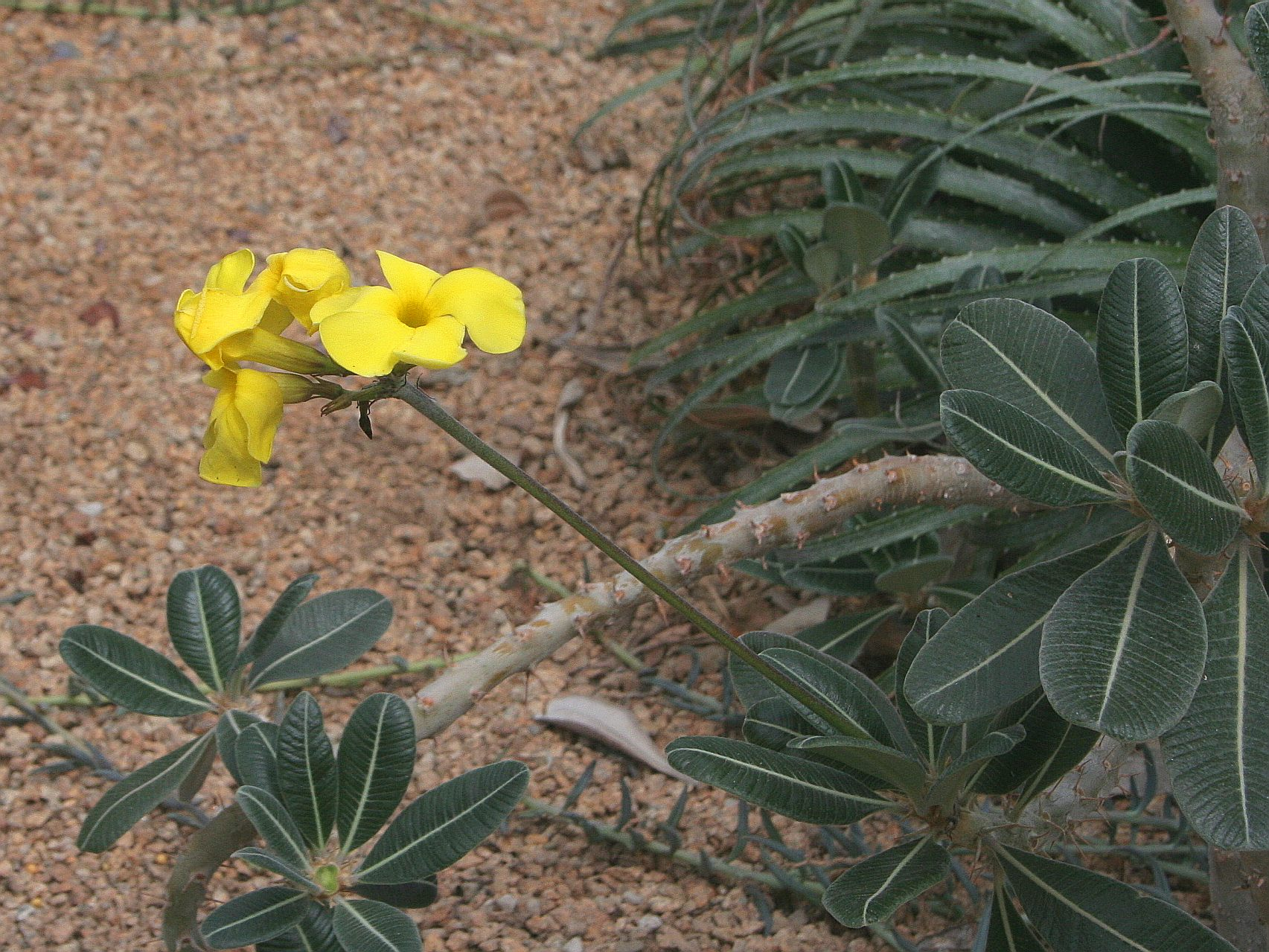
Inflorescence of P. rosulatum in the Conservatoire botanique national de Brest, France

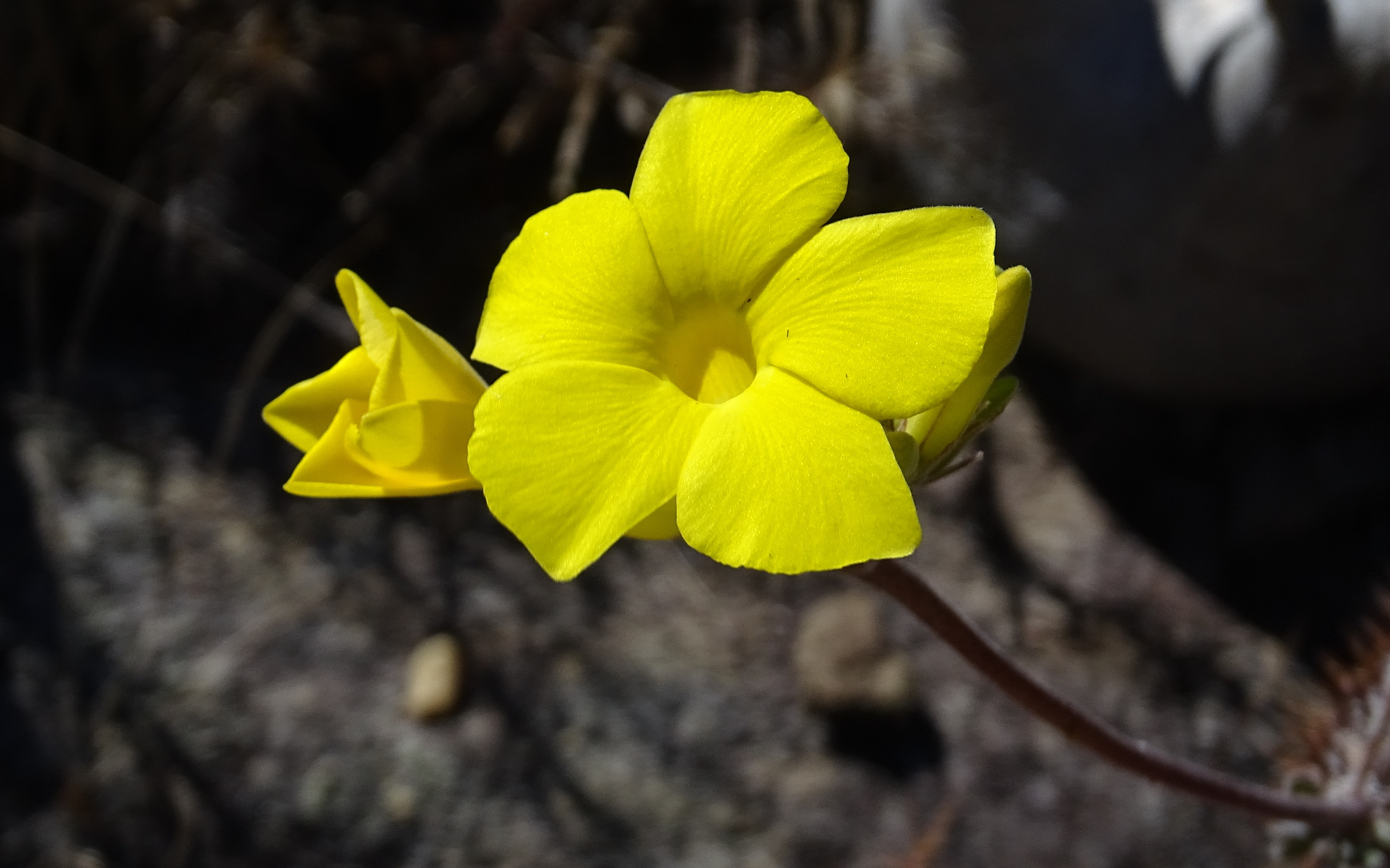
Elephant’s foot flowering in the Isalo National Park, Madagascar

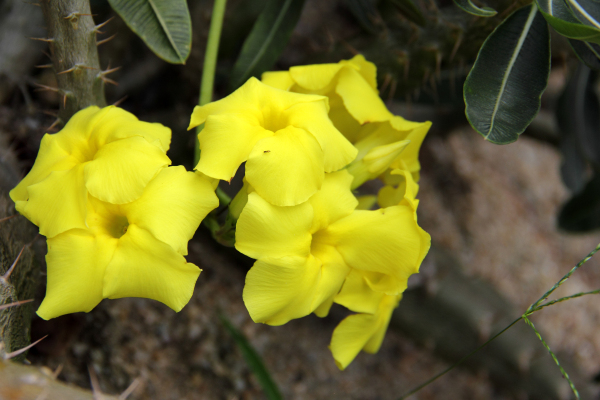
P. rosulatum in SCBG, from Flower View

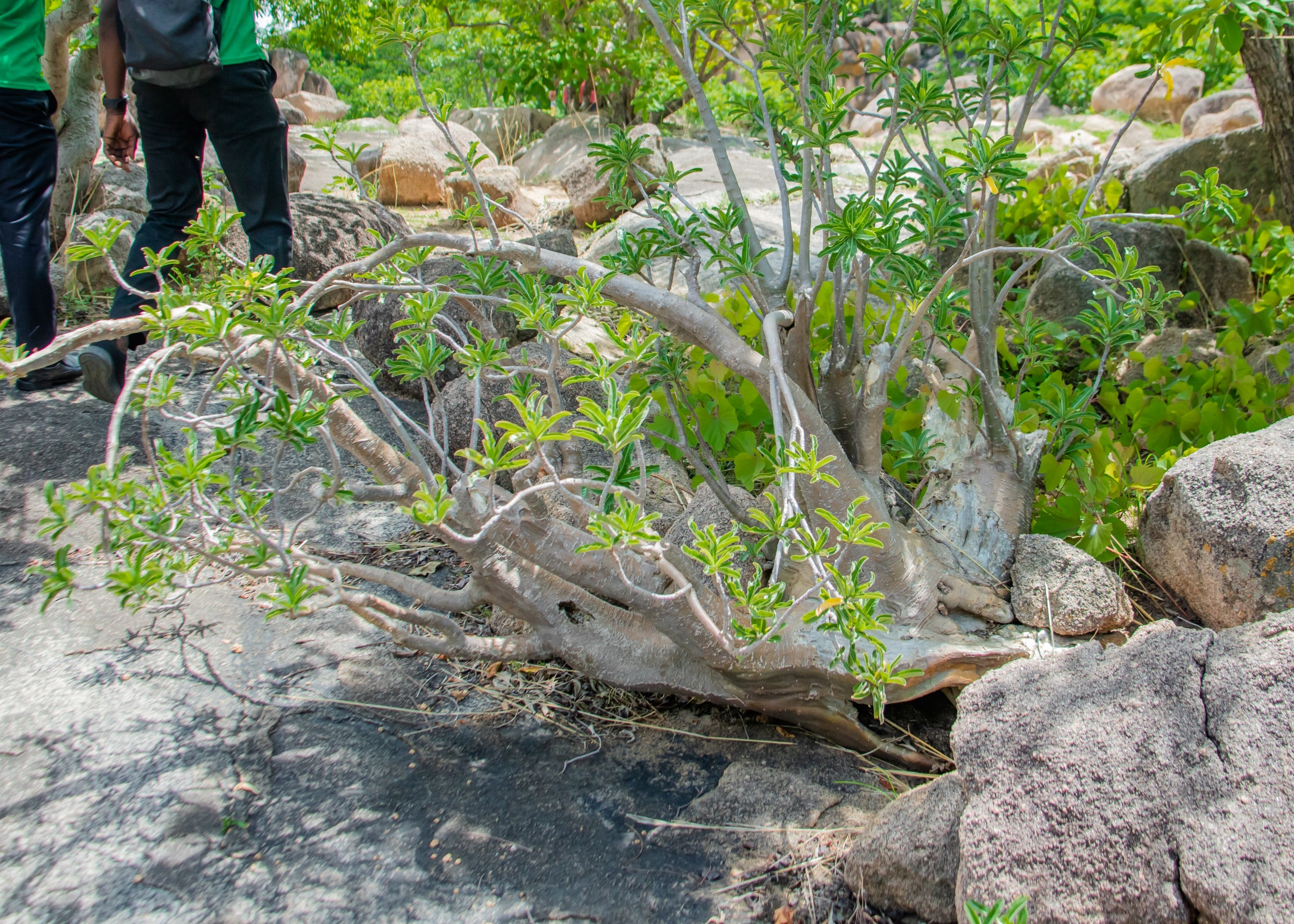
Pachypodium rosulatum at Tongo Hills in Ghana
