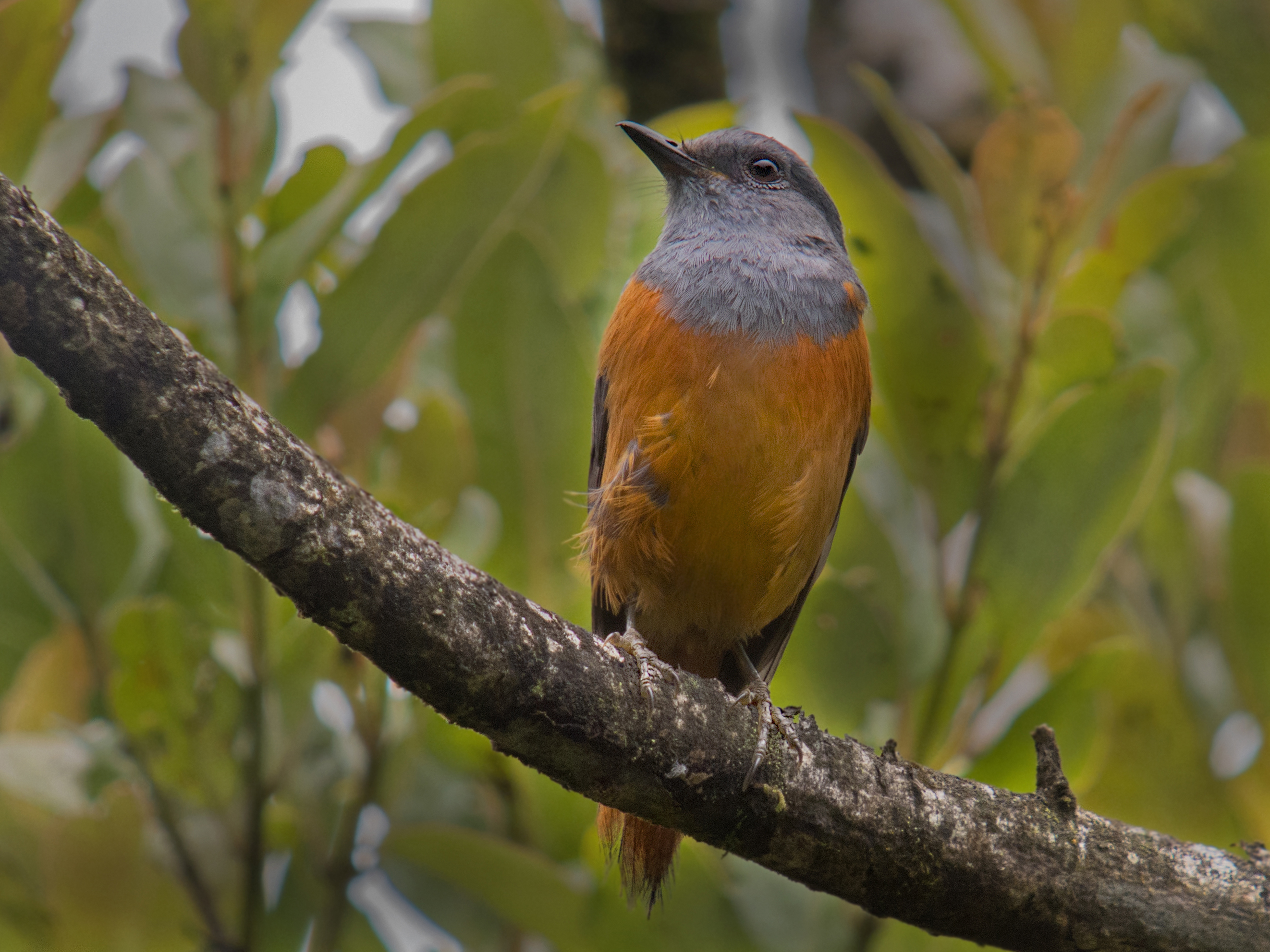
- at Ranomafana National Park, Madagascar

Conservation status
- Least Concern (IUCN 3.1)

Scientific classification
- Kingdom: Animalia
- Phylum: Chordata
- Class: Aves
- Order: Passeriformes
- Family: Muscicapidae
- Genus: Monticola
- Species: M. sharpei

Binomial name
- Monticola sharpei (GR Gray, 1871)

Synonyms
- Pseudocossyphus sharpei (Gray, 1871)

= Forest rock thrush =

Species of bird

The forest rock thrush (Monticola sharpei) is a songbird in the family Muscicapidae, formerly placed in the Turdidae together with the other chats. It now includes Benson's rock thrush and Amber Mountain rock thrush as subspecies.

It is endemic to Madagascar. The type locality is the forests east of Ambatondrazaka, which in turn lies south of Lake Alaotra.

Its natural habitats are subtropical or tropical moist lowland forest and subtropical or tropical moist montane forest.

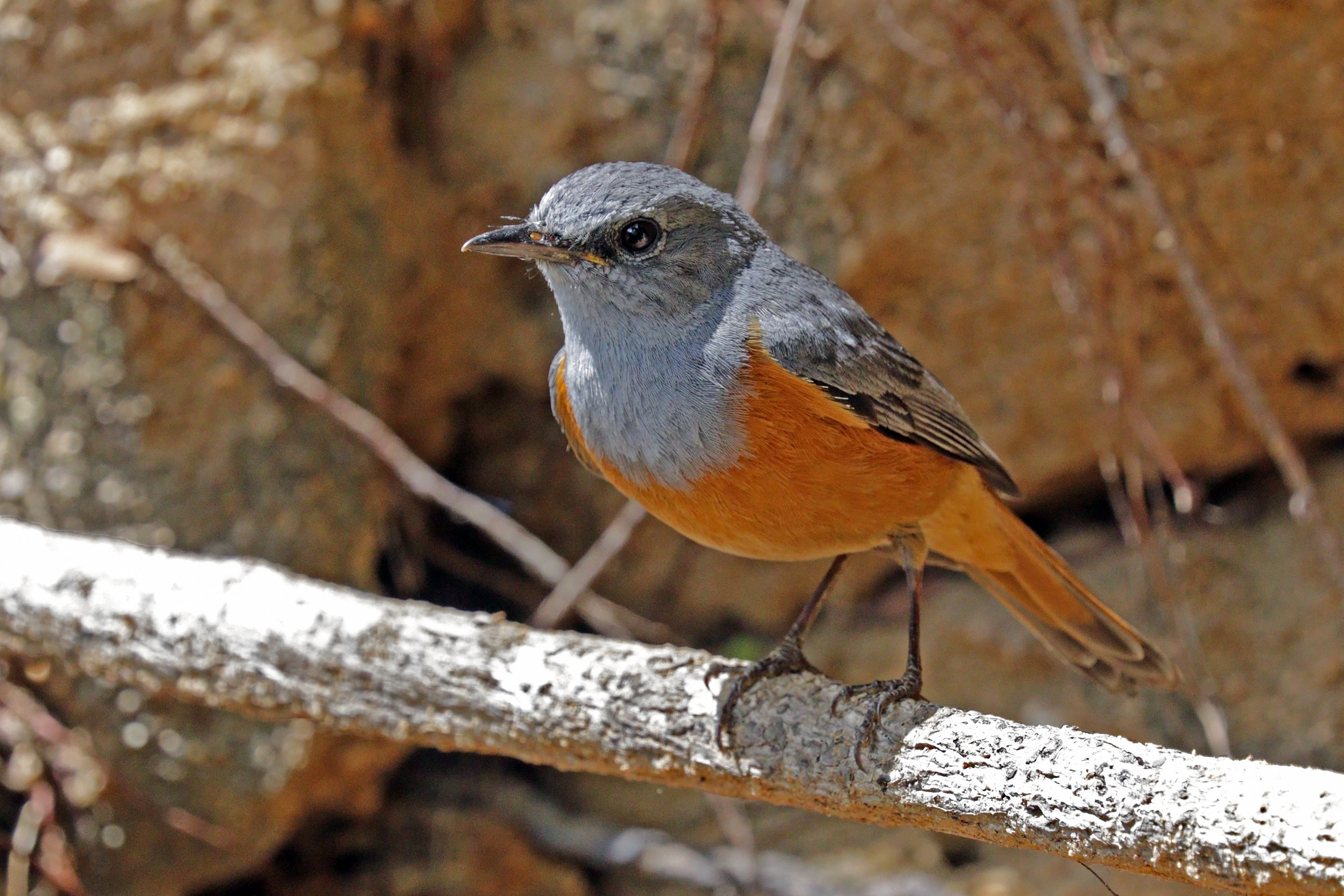
M. s. bensoni, native to Madagascar's southwest
