= Bulbophyllum sect. Bifalcula =

Scientific classification
- Kingdom: Plantae
- Clade: Tracheophytes
- Clade: Angiosperms
- Clade: Monocots
- Order: Asparagales
- Family: Orchidaceae
- Subfamily: Epidendroideae
- Genus: Bulbophyllum
- Section: Bulbophyllum sect. Bifalcula; Schltr. 1925

Type species
- Bulbophyllum implexum

Species
- See text

Section of flowering plants

Bulbophyllum sect. Bifalcula is a section of the genus Bulbophyllum.

== Description ==
Species in this section have 2 leaved pseudobulbs and a raceme with multiple flowers with and basal tooth on the lip.

== Distribution ==
Plants from this section are found in Madagascar.

== Species ==
Bulbophyllum section Bifalcula comprises the following species:

Image	Name	Distribution	Elevation (m)
	Bulbophyllum capuronii Bosser 1971	Madagascar	0–100 metres (0–328 ft)
	Bulbophyllum complanatum H.Perrier 1937	Madagascar	0–1,600 metres (0–5,249 ft)
	Bulbophyllum implexum Jum. & H.Perrier 1912	Madagascar	0–800 metres (0–2,625 ft)
	Bulbophyllum macrocarpum Frapp. ex Cordem. 1895	Reunion	
	Bulbophyllum minutum Thouars 1822	Madagacar, Mascarenes and Reunion	0–800 metres (0–2,625 ft)
