= Eremolaena =

Scientific classification
- Kingdom: Plantae
- Clade: Tracheophytes
- Clade: Angiosperms
- Clade: Eudicots
- Clade: Rosids
- Order: Malvales
- Family: Sarcolaenaceae
- Genus: Eremolaena; Baill.

Species
- Eremolaena darainensis; Eremolaena humblotiana; Eremolaena rotundifolia

Genus of flowering plants

Eremolaena is a genus of flowering plant in the Sarcolaenaceae family, endemic to Madagascar. The genus has three species, all native to the country's humid east coast.

The family Sarcolaenaceae is endemic to Madagascar. The genus appears to be most closely related to the genera Pentachlaena and Perrierodendron.

== Species ==
Eremolaena humblotiana, known by the vernacular names Amaninombilahy, Hamaninaombilahy and Fotona, is found in the humid Madagascar lowland forests and Madagascar subhumid forests ecoregions, up to 1200–1500 meters elevation, from the Brickaville to Vatomandry area, Betampona Reserve, Zahamena Reserve, and the area around Lac Alaotra.

Eremolaena rotundifolia, known by the vernacular names Amaninombilahy fotsy, Anjananjana, Fotona, Fotonala, Fotonalahy, Menahy lahy, Takodizahana lahy and Voantalanina, is native to littoral (seaside) forests on sand at Masoala National Park and in the Fort Dauphin area, in the Madagascar lowland forests ecoregion.
