= Schizolaena hystrix =

Conservation status
- Least Concern (IUCN 3.1)

Scientific classification
- Kingdom: Plantae
- Clade: Tracheophytes
- Clade: Angiosperms
- Clade: Eudicots
- Clade: Rosids
- Order: Malvales
- Family: Sarcolaenaceae
- Genus: Schizolaena
- Species: S. hystrix

Binomial name
- Schizolaena hystrix Capuron

Species of tree

Schizolaena hystrix is a tree in the family Sarcolaenaceae. It is endemic to Madagascar. The specific epithet hystrix means 'spiny', referring to the porcupine-like appearance of the involucre.

== Description ==
Schizolaena hystrix grows as a large tree up to 35 metres (110 ft) tall. Its leaves are coriaceous. The spiny involucre is fleshy and is thought to attract lemurs, bats and birds who in turn disperse the tree's seeds.

== Distribution and habitat ==
Schizolaena hystrix is known only from the northeastern regions of Sava, Alaotra-Mangoro, Analanjirofo and Atsinanana. Its habitat is humid evergreen forests from sea-level to 1,500 m (5,000 ft) altitude.

== Threats ==
Schizolaena hystrix is threatened by deforestation and by threats to the lemur. Deforestation due to shifting agriculture is occurring outside protected areas. However, 9 of 14 subpopulations of the tree are within protected areas. Threats to lemurs would in turn affect the tree's reproduction due to their role in seed dispersal.
