= Pentachlaena orientalis =

Conservation status
- Endangered (IUCN 3.1)

Scientific classification
- Kingdom: Plantae
- Clade: Tracheophytes
- Clade: Angiosperms
- Clade: Eudicots
- Clade: Rosids
- Order: Malvales
- Family: Sarcolaenaceae
- Genus: Pentachlaena
- Species: P. orientalis

Binomial name
- Pentachlaena orientalis Capuron

Species of tree

Pentachlaena orientalis is a tree in the family Sarcolaenaceae. It is endemic to Madagascar.

== Description ==
Pentachlaena orientalis grows as a tree up to 30 metres (100 ft) tall with a trunk diameter of up to 90 cm (35 in). Its leaves are elliptic and measure up to 18 cm (7 in) long.

== Distribution and habitat ==
Pentachlaena orientalis is known from the eastern regions of Alaotra-Mangoro, Analanjirofo and Atsinanana. Its habitat is humid forest from sea level to about 2,000 m (6,600 ft) altitude. Some subpopulations of the species occur in protected areas.
