= Schizolaena pectinata =

Conservation status
- Vulnerable (IUCN 3.1)

Scientific classification
- Kingdom: Plantae
- Clade: Tracheophytes
- Clade: Angiosperms
- Clade: Eudicots
- Clade: Rosids
- Order: Malvales
- Family: Sarcolaenaceae
- Genus: Schizolaena
- Species: S. pectinata

Binomial name
- Schizolaena pectinata Capuron

Species of tree

Schizolaena pectinata is a tree in the family Sarcolaenaceae. It is endemic to Madagascar.

== Description ==
Schizolaena pectinata grows as a tree up to 25 metres (80 ft) tall. Its elliptic to ovate leaves measure up to 7.5 cm (3 in) long. The small flowers are white or pink. The involucre of the flowers is fleshy and laciniate. It is thought to attract lemurs, bats and birds who in turn disperse the tree's seeds.

== Distribution and habitat ==
Schizolaena pectinata is known only from the eastern regions of Vatovavy-Fitovinany, Alaotra-Mangoro and Atsinanana. Its habitat is humid and subhumid forests from sea-level to 1,000 m (3,300 ft) altitude.

== Threats ==
Two subpopulations of the species are in the protected areas of Betampona Integral Natural Reserve and Perinet-Analamazaotra Special Reserve. Outside of these areas, the species is threatened by shifting patterns of agriculture.
