= Perrierodendron occidentale =

Conservation status
- Vulnerable (IUCN 3.1)

Scientific classification
- Kingdom: Plantae
- Clade: Tracheophytes
- Clade: Angiosperms
- Clade: Eudicots
- Clade: Rosids
- Order: Malvales
- Family: Sarcolaenaceae
- Genus: Perrierodendron
- Species: P. occidentale

Binomial name
- Perrierodendron occidentale J.-F.Leroy, Lowry, Haev., Labat & G.E.Schatz

Species of tree

Perrierodendron occidentale is a tree in the family Sarcolaenaceae. It is endemic to Madagascar.

== Description ==
Perrierodendron occidentale grows as a tree up to 20 metres (70 ft) tall. Its chartaceous leaves are obovate to elliptical in shape. They are coloured brown above, green below and measure up to 6.5 cm (3 in) long. The inflorescences bear one to five flowers, each with five sepals and five petals. The smooth fruits are obovoid in shape and measure up to 1.5 cm (0.6 in) long.

== Distribution and habitat ==
Perrierodendron occidentale is widely distributed in the western regions of Haute Matsiatra, Ihorombe and Atsimo-Andrefana. Its habitat is forests from sea level to 1,000 m (3,300 ft) altitude. Some subpopulations are in Isalo and Zombitse-Vohibasia National Parks.
