= Xerochlamys bojeriana =

Scientific classification
- Kingdom: Plantae
- Clade: Embryophytes
- Clade: Tracheophytes
- Clade: Angiosperms
- Clade: Eudicots
- Clade: Rosids
- Order: Malvales
- Family: Sarcolaenaceae
- Genus: Xerochlamys
- Species: X. bojeriana

Binomial name
- Xerochlamys bojeriana (Baill.) F.Gérard

Synonyms
- Leptolaena bojeriana (Baill.) Cavaco; Sarcolaena bojeriana Baill.; Sarcolaena grandidieri Baill.; Xerochlamys grandidieri (Baill.) F. Gérard; Xerochlamys pilosa Baker; Xerochlamys pubescens Baker

Species of plant

Xerochlamys bojeriana is a plant in the family Sarcolaenaceae. It is endemic to Madagascar.

== Description ==
Xerochlamys bojeriana grows as a shrub. Its papery to somewhat leathery leaves measure up to 2.5 cm (1 in) long. The flowers may be solitary or in inflorescences of two flowers, with pink to white petals. The roundish fruits measure up to 1.0 cm (0.4 in) long.

== Distribution and habitat ==
Xerochlamys bojeriana is native to central Madagascar. Its habitat is woodlands to 2,000 m (6,600 ft) elevation. This habitat is threatened by wildfires. The species is present in protected areas including Isalo National Park.
