= Rhodolaena humblotii =

Conservation status
- Least Concern (IUCN 3.1)

Scientific classification
- Kingdom: Plantae
- Clade: Tracheophytes
- Clade: Angiosperms
- Clade: Eudicots
- Clade: Rosids
- Order: Malvales
- Family: Sarcolaenaceae
- Genus: Rhodolaena
- Species: R. humblotii

Binomial name
- Rhodolaena humblotii Baill.

Species of flowering plant

Rhodolaena humblotii is a plant in the family Sarcolaenaceae. It is endemic to Madagascar.

== Description ==
Rhodolaena humblotii grows as a shrub or small to medium-sized tree. The twigs have dense hairs. Its leaves are small and elliptic in shape. The inflorescences bear two flowers on a short peduncle. Individual flowers are large with five sepals and five pink-red petals, measuring up 5 centimetres (2 in) long. The fruits are medium-sized and woody.

== Distribution and habitat ==
Rhodolaena humblotii is only found in the eastern regions of Vatovavy-Fitovinany, Alaotra-Mangoro, Analanjirofo and Atsinanana. Its habitat is evergreen and humid forests from 20 metres (100 ft) to 1,200 m (4,000 ft) altitude.

== Threats ==
Rhodolaena humblotii is threatened by timber exploitation. The timber is used in construction. Future population decline of the tree due to habitat loss is predicted at 50% to 80%, though subpopulations in protected areas are considered stable.
