= Perrierodendron quartzitorum =

Conservation status
- Critically Endangered (IUCN 3.1)

Scientific classification
- Kingdom: Plantae
- Clade: Tracheophytes
- Clade: Angiosperms
- Clade: Eudicots
- Clade: Rosids
- Order: Malvales
- Family: Sarcolaenaceae
- Genus: Perrierodendron
- Species: P. quartzitorum

Binomial name
- Perrierodendron quartzitorum J.-F.Leroy, Lowry, Haev., Labat & G.E.Schatz

Species of flowering plant

Perrierodendron quartzitorum is a plant in the family Sarcolaenaceae. It is endemic to Madagascar.

== Description ==
Perrierodendron quartzitorum grows as a shrub or small tree up to 6 metres (20 ft) tall. Its chartaceous to subcoriaceous leaves are obovate to elliptical in shape. They are coloured dark green above, pale green below and measure up to 4 cm (2 in) long. The inflorescences bear one to three flowers, each with five sepals and five white petals. The orange fruits are conical and measure up to 2.5 cm (1 in) long.

== Distribution and habitat ==
Perrierodendron quartzitorum is found only in a single location in the Itremo Massif in the central region of Amoron'i Mania. The estimated area of occupancy is 45 km^{2} (17 sq mi). Its habitat is rocky areas and woodlands at about 1,000–2,000 m (3,300–6,600 ft) altitude.

== Threats ==
Perrierodendron quartzitorum is threatened by nomadic animal grazing and seasonal uncontrolled wildfires. The species population is decreasing. Formerly, there were subpopulations in Isalo and Zombitse-Vohibasia National Parks, but, as of the IUCN species assessment in 2015, there are no longer any subpopulations in protected areas.
