= Perrierodendron rodoense =

Conservation status
- Critically Endangered (IUCN 3.1)

Scientific classification
- Kingdom: Plantae
- Clade: Tracheophytes
- Clade: Angiosperms
- Clade: Eudicots
- Clade: Rosids
- Order: Malvales
- Family: Sarcolaenaceae
- Genus: Perrierodendron
- Species: P. rodoense

Binomial name
- Perrierodendron rodoense J.-F.Leroy, Lowry, Haev., Labat & G.E.Schatz

Species of tree

Perrierodendron rodoense is a tree in the family Sarcolaenaceae. It is endemic to Madagascar. The specific epithet rodoense is for the Irodo River (or Rodo), where the species was studied.

== Description ==
Perrierodendron rodoense grows as a tree up to 12 metres (40 ft) tall with a trunk diameter of up to 50 cm (20 in). Its chartaceous to subcoriaceous leaves are obovate in shape. They are coloured dark brown above, light brown below and measure up to 4 cm (2 in) long. The inflorescences bear a single flower with five sepals and five whitish petals. The fruits are unknown.

== Distribution and habitat ==
Perrierodendron rodoense is known only from a single location in the Irodo basin in the northern region of Diana. Its habitat is dry forests from sea level to 500 m (1,600 ft) altitude.
