= Schizolaena masoalensis =

Conservation status
- Endangered (IUCN 3.1)

Scientific classification
- Kingdom: Plantae
- Clade: Tracheophytes
- Clade: Angiosperms
- Clade: Eudicots
- Clade: Rosids
- Order: Malvales
- Family: Sarcolaenaceae
- Genus: Schizolaena
- Species: S. masoalensis

Binomial name
- Schizolaena masoalensis Lowry, G.E.Schatz, J.-F.Leroy & A.-E.Wolf

Species of flowering plant

Schizolaena masoalensis is a plant in the family Sarcolaenaceae. It is endemic to Madagascar. The specific epithet refers to the Masoala peninsula where the species is found.

== Description ==
Schizolaena masoalensis grows as a liana or tree. Its papery leaves are elliptic to ovate in shape and are coloured grayish green above, tinted orangish below. They measure up to 7 cm (3 in) long. The inflorescences bear many flowers, each with three sepals and five petals. The fruits, featuring a fleshy involucre, lend themselves to seed dispersal by a number of lemur and bat species. The wood is locally used in construction.

== Distribution and habitat ==
Schizolaena masoalensis is known only from the northeastern regions of Sava and Analanjirofo, on the Masoala peninsula. Its habitat is humid evergreen forests near the sea and at low elevations, from 39–191 m (128–627 ft).

== Conservation ==
Schizolaena masoalensis has been assessed as endangered on the IUCN Red List. With two known subpopulations, it is threatened by agriculture, local harvesting for its wood and by cyclones and wildfires. The species' presence in Masoala National Park affords it some protection there.
