= Schizolaena microphylla =

Conservation status
- Vulnerable (IUCN 3.1)

Scientific classification
- Kingdom: Plantae
- Clade: Tracheophytes
- Clade: Angiosperms
- Clade: Eudicots
- Clade: Rosids
- Order: Malvales
- Family: Sarcolaenaceae
- Genus: Schizolaena
- Species: S. microphylla

Binomial name
- Schizolaena microphylla H.Perrier

Species of flowering plant

Schizolaena microphylla is a tree in the family Sarcolaenaceae. It is endemic to Madagascar. The specific epithet microphylla means 'small leaves'.

== Description ==
Schizolaena microphylla grows as a tree up to 10 m (33 ft) tall, exceptionally up to 25 m (80 ft). Its leaves are elliptic to ovate or roundish in shape and are hairy on the underside.

== Distribution and habitat ==
Schizolaena microphylla is known only from the central regions of Vakinankaratra and Amoron'i Mania. Its habitat is subhumid forests from 1,000–2,000 m (3,300–6,600 ft) altitude.

== Conservation ==
Schizolaena microphylla has been assessed as vulnerable on the IUCN Red List. Its habitat is threatened by wildfires, mining, grazing, and logging, including for firewood. However, the species is present in the protected areas of Ibity and Itremo.
