= Xerochlamys tampoketsensis =

Conservation status
- Vulnerable (IUCN 3.1)

Scientific classification
- Kingdom: Plantae
- Clade: Tracheophytes
- Clade: Angiosperms
- Clade: Eudicots
- Clade: Rosids
- Order: Malvales
- Family: Sarcolaenaceae
- Genus: Xerochlamys
- Species: X. tampoketsensis

Binomial name
- Xerochlamys tampoketsensis F.Gérard

Synonyms
- Xerochlamys rupestris F.Gérard

Species of tree

Xerochlamys tampoketsensis is a tree in the family Sarcolaenaceae. It is endemic to Madagascar.

== Description ==
Xerochlamys tampoketsensis grows as a small tree up to 5 metres (20 ft) tall. Its coriaceous leaves are elliptic to oblong in shape and measure up to 6 cm (2 in) long. The tree's flowers are occasionally solitary or generally in inflorescences of two flowers, with pale yellow petals. The roundish fruits measure up to 1.2 cm (0.5 in) in diameter with black seeds.

== Distribution and habitat ==
Xerochlamys tampoketsensis is only found in the regions of Analamanga, Betsiboka, Melaky and Sofia. Its habitat is subhumid to dry forests from 500 metres (1,600 ft) to 1,400 m (4,600 ft) altitude. Only one population of the trees is in a protected area. The conservation status of the species is vulnerable.
