= Xyloolaena =

Scientific classification
- Kingdom: Plantae
- Clade: Tracheophytes
- Clade: Angiosperms
- Clade: Eudicots
- Clade: Rosids
- Order: Malvales
- Family: Sarcolaenaceae
- Genus: Xyloolaena; Baill. (1879)

Species
- Xyloolaena humbertii Cavaco; Xyloolaena perrieri F.Gérard; Xyloolaena richardii (Baill.) Baill.; Xyloolaena sambiranensis Lowry & G.E.Schatz; Xyloolaena speciosa Lowry & G.E.Schatz

Synonyms
- Scleroolaena Baill. (1872), nom. illeg.

Genus of flowering plants

Xyloolaena is a genus within Sarcolaenaceae family.

Within Sarcolaenaceae, Xyloolaena appears to be most closely related to Sarcolaena and Leptolaena.

== Species ==
The genus has five species of shrubs and trees, all endemic to Madagascar.

- Xyloolaena humbertii Cavaco 1950 is a small tree, 6–8 m tall, known from only a single collection found in transitional vegetation between sclerophyllous forest and dry bush (800–900 m elevation). It was collected from the locality where now Andohahela National Park exists (Toliara province).
- Xyloolaena perrieri F.Gérard 1919 is a tree c. 4–10 m tall that has been recorded at scattered localities from near Morondava, Ankarafantsika National Park and the Lokia River basin east of Ambilobe within Madagascar's dry bioclimatic region (Antsiranana, Mahajanga and Toliara provinces). Vernacular name – Zahana.
- Xyloolaena richardii (Baill.) Baill. (1872) 1884 is a tree c. 4–20 m tall, ranging from sea level to over 1,500 m elevation in areas with a humid bioclimate in northeastern Madagascar, with one population recorded in the far southeast (Antsiranana, Toamasina and Toliara provinces). Vernacular names – Fakody, Fombaotoafo, Pesoala, Takodibe, Tamboro, Tsikody zahana, Vahitoambody, Voakoropetaka, Voantiambody, Voantsatroka.
- Xyloolaena sambiranensis Lowry & G.E.Schatz 2002 is a shrub to tree 3–12 m tall distributed in the Sambirano region (subhumid bioclimate) from south of Maromandia north to the Ambanja area (Antsiranana and Mahajanga provinces). Vernacular names – Sofiakomba, Sofiankomba, Sofikomba, Sofinakomba, Sofinkomba.
- Xyloolaena speciosa Lowry & G.E.Schatz 2002 is a large shrub or tree to 20 m tall. It is narrowly distributed in an area with a dry to subhumid bioclimate extending from the Ambato Peninsula and the lower Ifasy River valley north to near Ambilobe (Antsiranana province). Vernacular name – Marabanty.
