= Schizolaena parviflora =

Conservation status
- Vulnerable (IUCN 3.1)

Scientific classification
- Kingdom: Plantae
- Clade: Tracheophytes
- Clade: Angiosperms
- Clade: Eudicots
- Clade: Rosids
- Order: Malvales
- Family: Sarcolaenaceae
- Genus: Schizolaena
- Species: S. parviflora

Binomial name
- Schizolaena parviflora (F.Gérard) H.Perrier

Synonyms
- Rhodolaena parviflora F.Gérard

Species of tree

Schizolaena parviflora is a tree in the family Sarcolaenaceae. It is endemic to Madagascar. The specific epithet parviflora means 'small flowers'.

== Description ==
Schizolaena parviflora grows as a tree up to 20 metres (70 ft) tall. Its inflorescences are small and dense. The involucre is glabrous. It is thought to attract lemurs, bats and birds who in turn disperse the tree's seeds. The fruit is considered edible.

== Distribution and habitat ==
Schizolaena parviflora is known only from the northern regions of Diana and Sofia. Its habitat is subhumid forests from sea-level to 500 m (1,600 ft) altitude. Some subpopulations of the species are in protected areas.

== Uses ==
The timber of Schizolaena parviflora is used in construction and as firewood. It is also used to make charcoal.

== Threats ==
Schizolaena parviflora is threatened by deforestation due to shifting patterns of agriculture. The species is also threatened by timber harvesting and wildfires.
