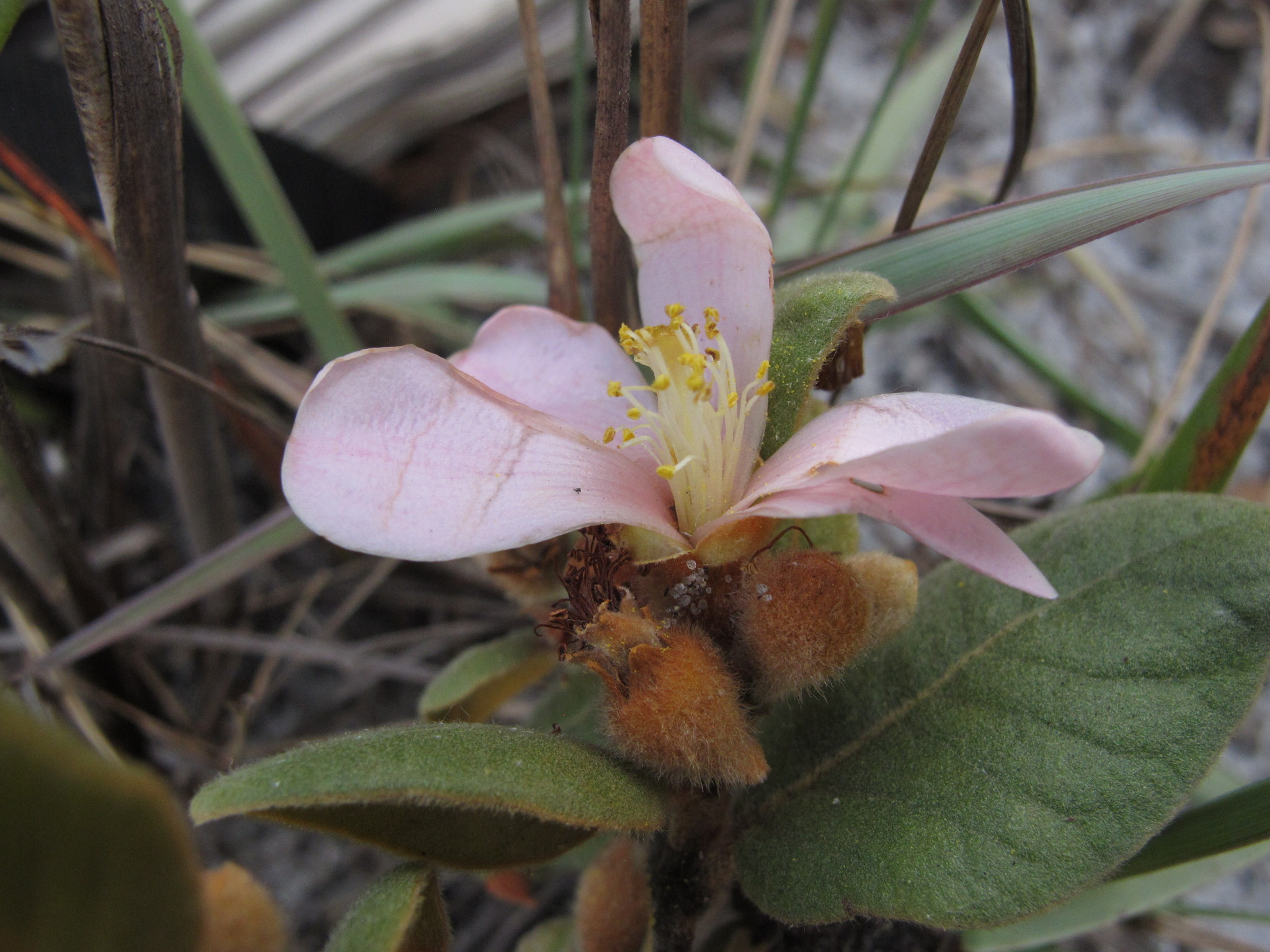

Conservation status
- Endangered (IUCN 3.1)

Scientific classification
- Kingdom: Plantae
- Clade: Embryophytes
- Clade: Tracheophytes
- Clade: Angiosperms
- Clade: Eudicots
- Clade: Rosids
- Order: Malvales
- Family: Sarcolaenaceae
- Genus: Xerochlamys
- Species: X. diospyroidea

Binomial name
- Xerochlamys diospyroidea (Baill.) F.Gérard

Synonyms
- Leptolaena diospyroidea (Baill.) Cavaco; Sarcolaena diospyroidea Baill.

= Xerochlamys diospyroidea =

Species of plant

Xerochlamys diospyroidea is a plant in the family Sarcolaenaceae. It is endemic to Madagascar.

== Description ==
Xerochlamys diospyroidea grows as a shrub or small tree. Its dark green, leathery leaves measure up to 4.5 cm (2 in) long. Its flowers are in inflorescences of two to eight flowers, with pink to white petals. The roundish fruits measure up to 1.0 cm (0.4 in) long.

== Distribution and habitat ==
Xerochlamys diospyroidea is only found in the Ambatofinandrahana District of the central region of Amoron'i Mania. Its habitat is evergreen woods from 1,300–1,830 metres (4,300–6,000 ft) altitude.

== Conservation ==
Xerochlamys diospyroidea is threatened by wildfires and by logging for its wood. There are some subpopulations in the Itremo New Protected Area.
