= Rhodolaena acutifolia =

Conservation status
- Vulnerable (IUCN 3.1)

Scientific classification
- Kingdom: Plantae
- Clade: Tracheophytes
- Clade: Angiosperms
- Clade: Eudicots
- Clade: Rosids
- Order: Malvales
- Family: Sarcolaenaceae
- Genus: Rhodolaena
- Species: R. acutifolia

Binomial name
- Rhodolaena acutifolia Baker

Species of flowering plant

Rhodolaena acutifolia is a plant in the family Sarcolaenaceae. It is endemic to Madagascar. The specific epithet acutifolia means 'sharp-leafed'.

== Description ==
Rhodolaena acutifolia grows as a small tree or shrub. Its leaves are small, subcoriaceous, elliptic in shape, tapering to a point and sharp at the base. They measure up to 3 centimetres (1.2 in) wide. The flowers are paired in solitary inflorescences on a long stem. Individual flowers are very large with bright purple-pink petals, measuring up 5 cm (2 in) long. The fruits are dark green, drying black.

== Distribution and habitat ==
Rhodolaena acutifolia is only found in the east central regions of Analamanga, Alaotra-Mangoro and Analanjirofo. Its habitat is humid evergreen forests from 350 m (1,000 ft) to 800 m (2,600 ft) altitude. Two subpopulations of the trees are in Zahamena National Park.

== Threats ==
Rhodolaena acutifolia is threatened by harvesting for timber. Due to shifting cultivation, future habitat loss is predicted at up to 50%.
