= Schizolaena elongata =

Conservation status
- Least Concern (IUCN 3.1)

Scientific classification
- Kingdom: Plantae
- Clade: Tracheophytes
- Clade: Angiosperms
- Clade: Eudicots
- Clade: Rosids
- Order: Malvales
- Family: Sarcolaenaceae
- Genus: Schizolaena
- Species: S. elongata

Binomial name
- Schizolaena elongata Thouars

Species of tree

Schizolaena elongata is a tree in the family Sarcolaenaceae. It is endemic to Madagascar.

== Description ==
Schizolaena elongata grows as a tree up to 15 metres (50 ft) tall. Its coriaceous leaves are discolorous.

== Distribution and habitat ==
Schizolaena elongata is known only from the eastern regions of Sava, Atsimo-Atsinanana, Vatovavy-Fitovinany, Analanjirofo and Atsinanana. Its habitat is humid coastal forests from sea-level to 500 m (1,600 ft) altitude.
