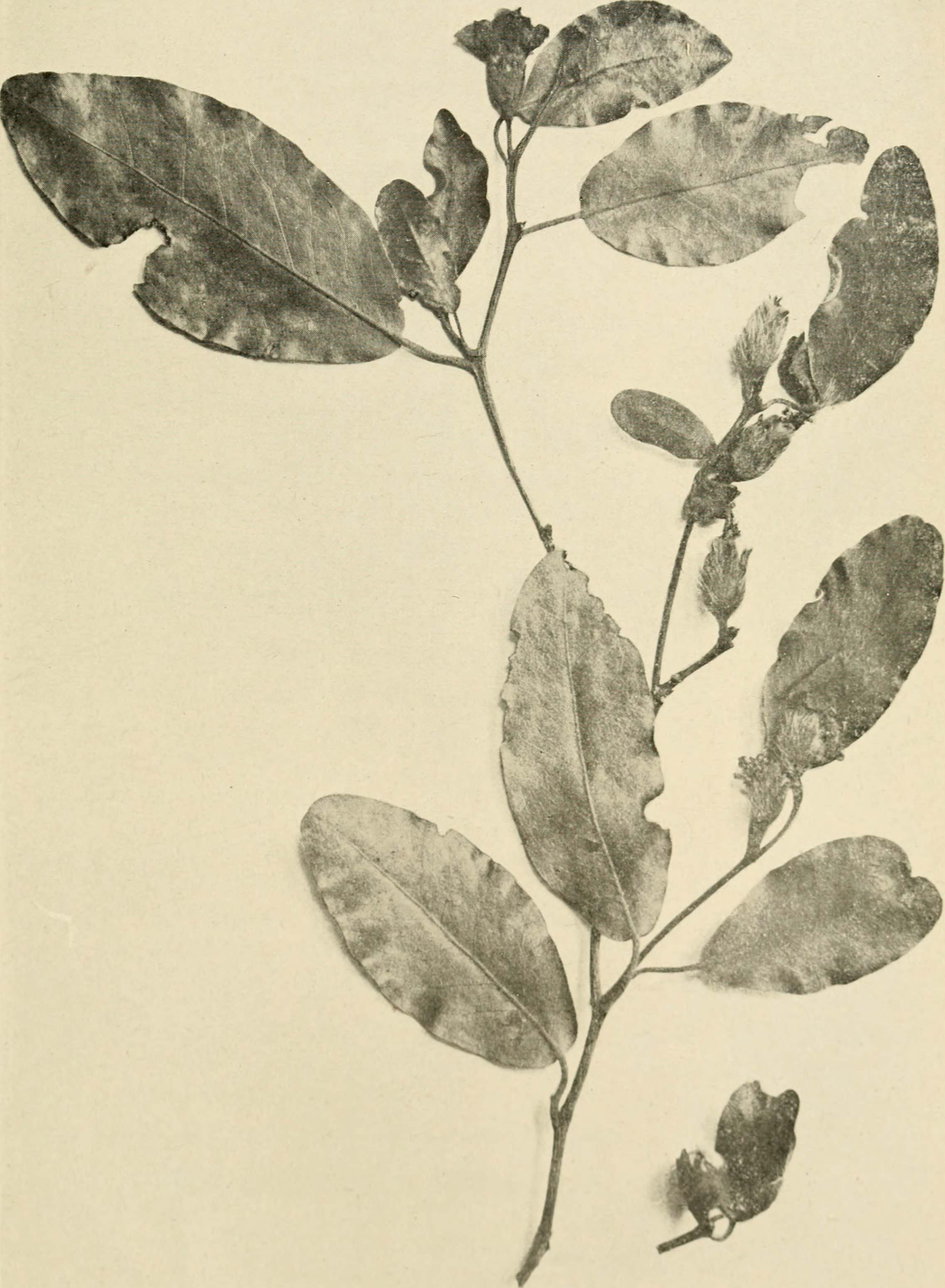

Conservation status
- Endangered (IUCN 3.1)

Scientific classification
- Kingdom: Plantae
- Clade: Embryophytes
- Clade: Tracheophytes
- Clade: Angiosperms
- Clade: Eudicots
- Clade: Rosids
- Order: Malvales
- Family: Sarcolaenaceae
- Genus: Xerochlamys
- Species: X. villosa

Binomial name
- Xerochlamys villosa F.Gérard

Synonyms
- Xerochlamys luteola H.Perrier

= Xerochlamys villosa =

Species of tree

Xerochlamys villosa is a tree in the family Sarcolaenaceae. It is endemic to Madagascar.

== Description ==
Xerochlamys villosa grows up to 8 metres (30 ft) tall, with a trunk diameter of up to 20 cm (8 in). The papery leaves are ovate to elliptic and measure up to 8 cm (3 in) long. The flowers, generally solitary or occasionally in inflorescences of two flowers, feature white petals. The roundish fruits measure up to 1.1 cm (0.4 in) long.

== Distribution and habitat ==
Xerochlamys villosa is native to southwestern Madagascar. Its habitat is forests from 450–1,500 m (1,500–4,900 ft) altitude.

== Conservation ==
Xerochlamys villosa is threatened by logging for use as firewood and by wildfires. The species is present in Isalo National Park.
