= Schizolaena charlotteae =

Conservation status
- Endangered (IUCN 3.1)

Scientific classification
- Kingdom: Plantae
- Clade: Tracheophytes
- Clade: Angiosperms
- Clade: Eudicots
- Clade: Rosids
- Order: Malvales
- Family: Sarcolaenaceae
- Genus: Schizolaena
- Species: S. charlotteae

Binomial name
- Schizolaena charlotteae Lowry & G.E.Schatz

Species of flowering plant

Schizolaena charlotteae is a plant in the family Sarcolaenaceae. It is endemic to Madagascar. The specific epithet is for the botanist Charlotte Rajeriarson of the University of Antananarivo.

== Description ==
Schizolaena charlotteae grows as a shrub or tree up to 15 metres (50 ft) tall. Its twigs are glabrous with small lenticels. The subcoriaceous leaves are elliptic to ovate or obovate in shape. They are coloured chocolate brown above and more orangish below, measuring up to 7.5 cm (3 in) long. The inflorescences bear numerous flowers, each with three sepals and five petals. The petals are bright pinkish red with yellow borders and measure up to 1.4 cm (0.6 in) long. The roundish fruits measure up to 1.5 cm (0.6 in) in diameter.

== Distribution and habitat ==
Schizolaena charlotteae is known only from the southeastern coastal region of Anosy. Its habitat is lowland humid forest from sea-level to about 500 m (1,600 ft) altitude.

== Conservation ==
Schizolaena charlotteae has been assessed as endangered on the IUCN Red List. Its habitat is threatened by grazing and wildfires. The species is also locally harvested. However, the species is present in one protected area, Tsitongambarika reserve.
