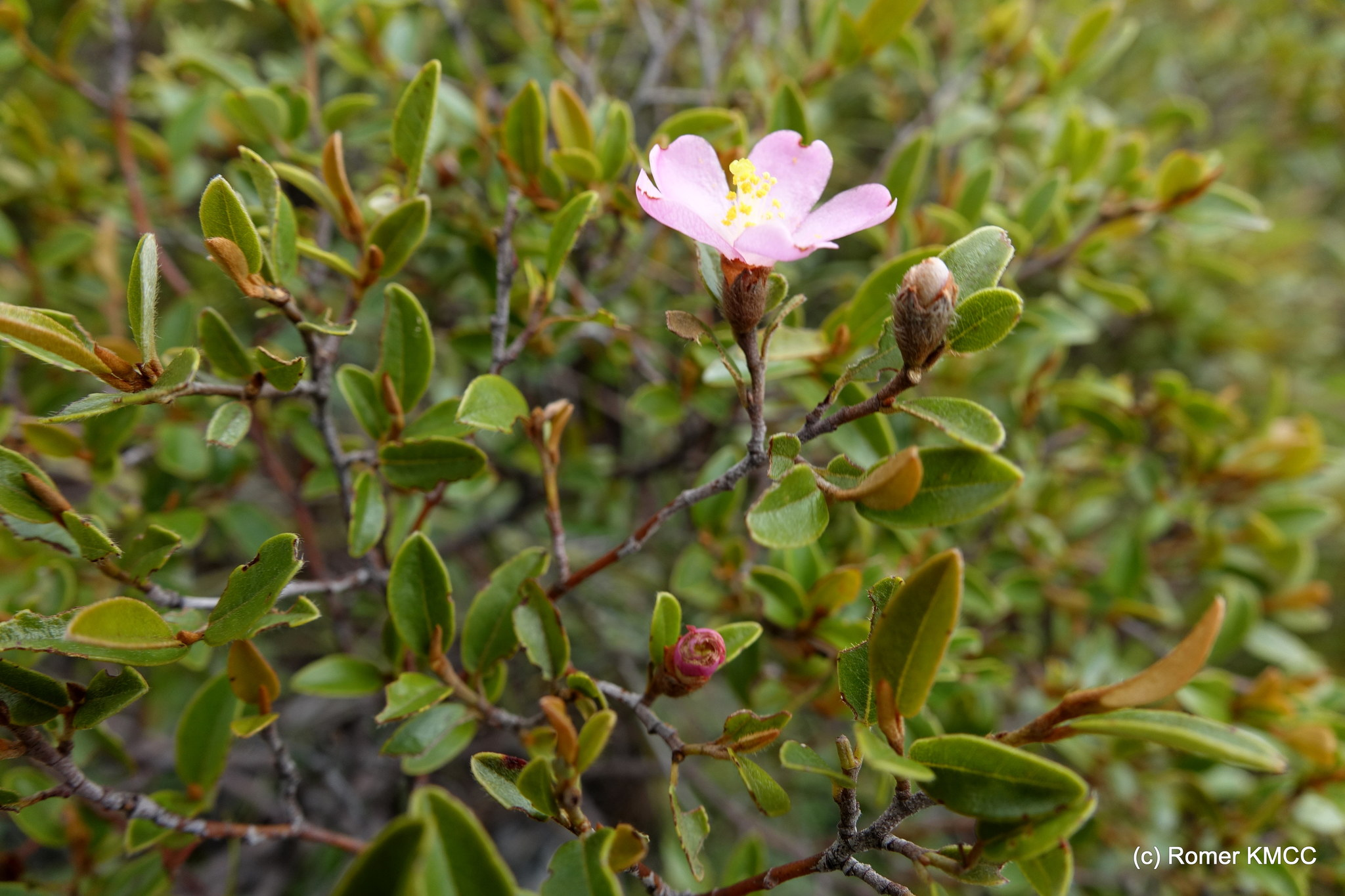

Conservation status
- Endangered (IUCN 3.1)

Scientific classification
- Kingdom: Plantae
- Clade: Tracheophytes
- Clade: Angiosperms
- Clade: Eudicots
- Clade: Rosids
- Order: Malvales
- Family: Sarcolaenaceae
- Genus: Xerochlamys
- Species: X. itremoensis

Binomial name
- Xerochlamys itremoensis Hong-Wa, G.E.Schatz & Lowry

= Xerochlamys itremoensis =

Species of shrub

Xerochlamys itremoensis is a shrub in the family Sarcolaenaceae. It is endemic to Madagascar.

== Description ==
Xerochlamys itremoensis grows as a prostrate shrub. Its leaves are glossy green above, green to yellow on the underside. They are elliptic in shape and measure up to 2 cm (1 in) long. The tree's flowers are solitary with pink to white petals. The roundish to ovoid fruits measure up to 0.8 cm (0.3 in) long with black seeds.

== Distribution and habitat ==
Xerochlamys itremoensis is only found in the Itremo Massif in the central region of Amoron'i Mania. Its habitat is subhumid woodlands from 1,300 metres (4,300 ft) to 1,800 m (6,000 ft) altitude.

== Threats ==
Xerochlamys itremoensis, along with other plant species endemic to the Itremo Massif, is threatened by wildfires, harvesting and mining. The species often grows in rocky areas where quartzite and marble are present and mined. The conservation status of the species is endangered.
