= Schizolaena exinvolucrata =

Conservation status
- Least Concern (IUCN 3.1)

Scientific classification
- Kingdom: Plantae
- Clade: Tracheophytes
- Clade: Angiosperms
- Clade: Eudicots
- Clade: Rosids
- Order: Malvales
- Family: Sarcolaenaceae
- Genus: Schizolaena
- Species: S. exinvolucrata

Binomial name
- Schizolaena exinvolucrata Baker

Synonyms
- Rhodolaena echinata H.Perrier

Species of tree

Schizolaena exinvolucrata is a tree in the family Sarcolaenaceae. It is endemic to Madagascar.

== Description ==
Schizolaena exinvolucrata grows as a tree up to 15 metres (50 ft) tall. Its leaves measure up to 8 cm (3 in) long. The peduncle and sepals are glabrous. It has a fleshy, glabrous involucre. The involucre is thought to attract lemurs, bats and birds who in turn disperse the tree's seeds.

== Distribution and habitat ==
Schizolaena exinvolucrata is known only from the eastern regions of Atsimo-Atsinanana, Vatovavy-Fitovinany, Alaotra-Mangoro, Analanjirofo, Atsinanana and Anosy. Its habitat is humid and subhumid forests from sea-level to 1,000 m (3,300 ft) altitude.

== Threats ==
Schizolaena exinvolucrata is threatened by deforestation due to shifting patterns of agriculture. Four of the tree's subpopulations (of 13) are within protected areas.
