= Schizolaena viscosa =

Conservation status
- Vulnerable (IUCN 3.1)

Scientific classification
- Kingdom: Plantae
- Clade: Tracheophytes
- Clade: Angiosperms
- Clade: Eudicots
- Clade: Rosids
- Order: Malvales
- Family: Sarcolaenaceae
- Genus: Schizolaena
- Species: S. viscosa

Binomial name
- Schizolaena viscosa F.Gérard

Species of tree

Schizolaena viscosa is a tree in the family Sarcolaenaceae. It is endemic to Madagascar.

== Description ==
Schizolaena viscosa grows as a tree up to 15 metres (50 ft) tall. Its densely hairy filaments are unique in the genus.

== Distribution and habitat ==
Schizolaena viscosa is known only from the northern region of Diana. Its habitat is dry forest from sea-level to 500 m (1,600 ft) altitude.
