= Schizolaena turkii =

Conservation status
- Endangered (IUCN 3.1)

Scientific classification
- Kingdom: Plantae
- Clade: Tracheophytes
- Clade: Angiosperms
- Clade: Eudicots
- Clade: Rosids
- Order: Malvales
- Family: Sarcolaenaceae
- Genus: Schizolaena
- Species: S. turkii

Binomial name
- Schizolaena turkii Lowry, G.E.Schatz, J.-F.Leroy & A.-E.Wolf

Species of flowering plant

Schizolaena turkii is a plant in the family Sarcolaenaceae. It is endemic to Madagascar. It is named for the botanist Daniel Turk.

== Description ==
Schizolaena turkii grows as a shrub or tree up to 6 m (20 ft) tall with a trunk diameter of up to 18 cm (7 in). Its papery leaves are elliptic to ovate in shape and measure up to 6.5 cm (2.6 in) long. The inflorescences are small and bear up to 15 flowers, each with three sepals and five pink petals. The roundish fruits are yellow and measure up to 0.8 cm (0.3 in) in diameter.

== Distribution and habitat ==
Schizolaena turkii is known only from the east central region of Vatovavy-Fitovinany. Its habitat is in humid evergreen forest, mainly near streams, from 600–700 m (2,000–2,300 ft) altitude.

== Conservation ==
Schizolaena turkii has been assessed as endangered on the IUCN Red List. Its habitat is threatened by logging for its timber and by shifting agriculture patterns and mining activity. While the species is not present within a protected area, there is a subpopulation on the border of Ranomafana National Park.
