= Schizolaena capuronii =

Conservation status
- Endangered (IUCN 3.1)

Scientific classification
- Kingdom: Plantae
- Clade: Tracheophytes
- Clade: Angiosperms
- Clade: Eudicots
- Clade: Rosids
- Order: Malvales
- Family: Sarcolaenaceae
- Genus: Schizolaena
- Species: S. capuronii

Binomial name
- Schizolaena capuronii Lowry, G.E.Schatz, J.-F.Leroy & A.-E.Wolf

Species of tree

Schizolaena capuronii is a tree in the family Sarcolaenaceae. It is endemic to Madagascar. The specific epithet is for the French botanist René Capuron.

== Description ==
Schizolaena capuronii grows as a tree up to 25 metres (80 ft) tall with a trunk diameter of up to 70 cm (30 in). Its subcoriaceous leaves are elliptic to obovate in shape, coloured dark brown and measure up to 3.5 centimetres (1.4 in) long. The inflorescences are small and have six to ten flowers, each with five petals. The fruits are unknown.

== Distribution and habitat ==
Schizolaena capuronii is known only from a single population in the northern region of Analanjirofo. Its habitat is humid forest from 500 metres (1,600 ft) to 1,000 m (3,300 ft) altitude.
