= Schizolaena manomboensis =

Conservation status
- Endangered (IUCN 3.1)

Scientific classification
- Kingdom: Plantae
- Clade: Tracheophytes
- Clade: Angiosperms
- Clade: Eudicots
- Clade: Rosids
- Order: Malvales
- Family: Sarcolaenaceae
- Genus: Schizolaena
- Species: S. manomboensis

Binomial name
- Schizolaena manomboensis Lowry, G.E.Schatz, J.-F.Leroy & A.-E.Wolf

Species of flowering plant

Schizolaena manomboensis is a tree in the family Sarcolaenaceae. It is endemic to Madagascar. The specific epithet refers to Manombo Special Reserve where the species is found.

== Description ==
Schizolaena manomboensis grows as a large tree up to 25 m (80 ft) tall with a trunk diameter of up to 70 cm (28 in). Its coriaceous leaves are elliptic to ovate in shape and are coloured brown above and orangish brown below. They measure up to 13 cm (5 in) long. The inflorescences have numerous flowers, each with three sepals and five petals. The round fruits measure up to 1 cm (0.4 in) in diameter and are partially hidden by the involucre. The wood is locally used in construction.

== Distribution and habitat ==
Schizolaena manomboensis is known only from the eastern coastal regions of Atsinanana and Atsimo-Atsinanana. Its habitat is humid forest from sea level to 500 m (1,600 ft) altitude. In Atsimo-Atsinanana, the species occurs in Manombo Reserve where forest is in a less degraded state than nearby areas.

== Conservation ==
Schizolaena manomboensis has been assessed as endangered on the IUCN Red List. Its habitat is threatened by deforestation and by agriculture, subsistence harvesting and wildfires. The species' presence in Manombo Special Reserve affords that subpopulation some protection.
