= Schizolaena gereaui =

Conservation status
- Least Concern (IUCN 3.1)

Scientific classification
- Kingdom: Plantae
- Clade: Tracheophytes
- Clade: Angiosperms
- Clade: Eudicots
- Clade: Rosids
- Order: Malvales
- Family: Sarcolaenaceae
- Genus: Schizolaena
- Species: S. gereaui

Binomial name
- Schizolaena gereaui Lowry, G.E.Schatz, J.-F.Leroy & A.-E.Wolf

Species of flowering plant

Schizolaena gereaui is a plant in the family Sarcolaenaceae. It is endemic to Madagascar. The specific epithet is for the botanist Roy Emile Gereau.

== Description ==
Schizolaena gereaui grows as a shrub or tree up to 10 metres (33 ft) tall with a trunk diameter of up to 30 cm (12 in). Its subcoriaceous leaves are elliptic to obovate in shape and coloured chocolate brown above and khaki brown below. They measure up to 6.5 cm (3 in) long. The inflorescences have one to three flowers, each with five petals. The round fruits measure up to 1 cm (0.4 in) in diameter.

== Distribution and habitat ==
Schizolaena gereaui is known only from the eastern regions of Sava, Atsimo-Atsinanana, Vatovavy-Fitovinany, Atsinanana and Anosy. Its habitat is humid forest from sea level to about 400 m (1,300 ft) altitude.

== Conservation ==
Schizolaena gereaui has been assessed as least concern on the IUCN Red List. Its habitat is threatened by conversion of land for agriculture, by harvesting of the species, wildfires and mining activities. However, the species is widespread in the east of the country and is present in numerous protected areas, including Andohahela, Masoala, Midongy du sud and Ranomafana national parks; Manombo Special Reserve; and Tsitongambarika protected area.
