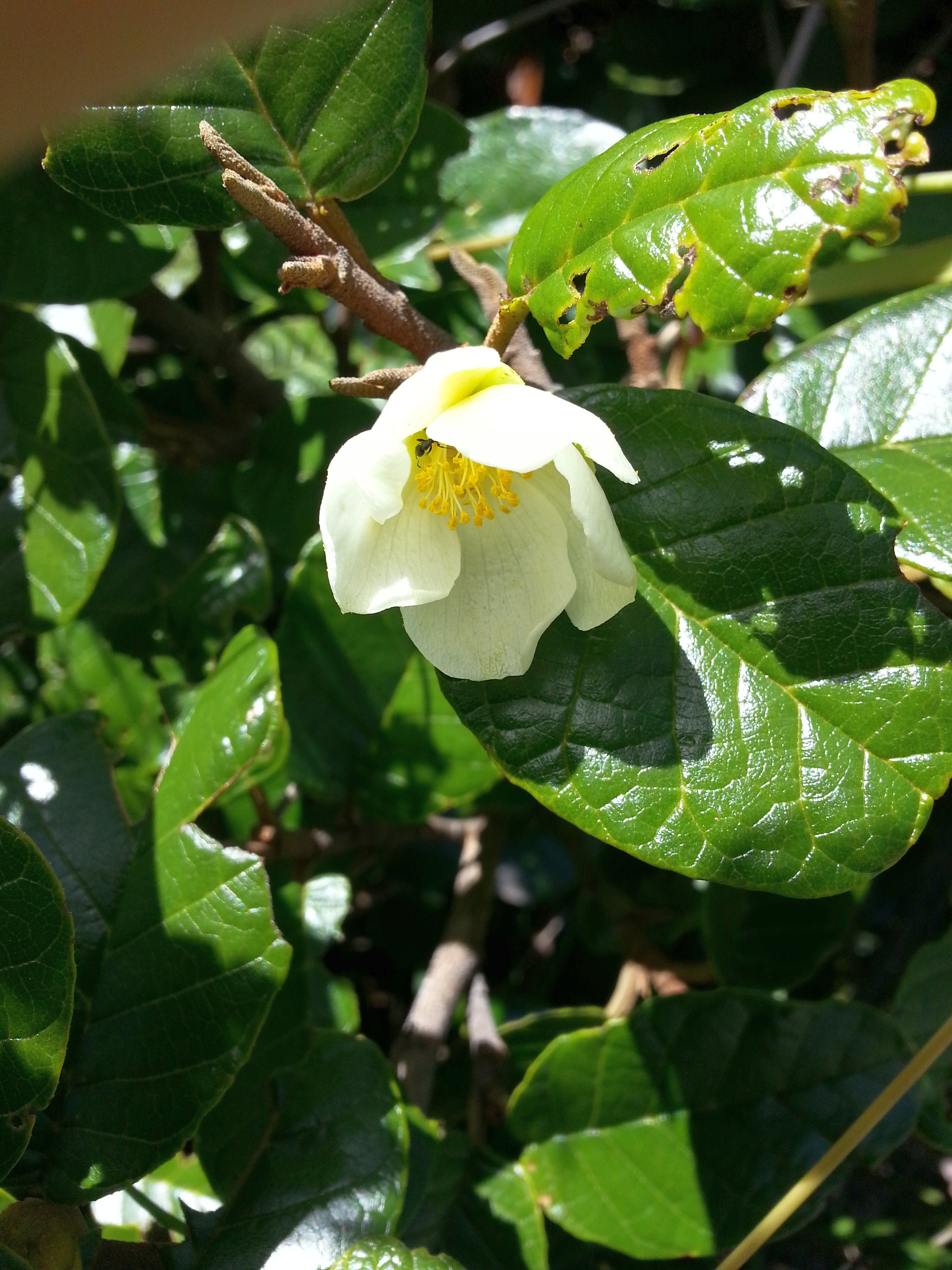
- In Vakinankaratra region, Madagascar

Conservation status
- Endangered (IUCN 3.1)

Scientific classification
- Kingdom: Plantae
- Clade: Tracheophytes
- Clade: Angiosperms
- Clade: Eudicots
- Clade: Rosids
- Order: Malvales
- Family: Sarcolaenaceae
- Genus: Pentachlaena
- Species: P. latifolia

Binomial name
- Pentachlaena latifolia H.Perrier

= Pentachlaena latifolia =

Species of flowering plant

Pentachlaena latifolia is a plant in the family Sarcolaenaceae. It is endemic to Madagascar. The specific epithet latifolia means 'broad-leaved'.

== Description ==
Pentachlaena latifolia grows as a shrub or small tree up to 6 metres (20 ft) tall. Its coriaceous leaves are elliptic to circular in shape. The flowers are either almost sessile or borne on short peduncles.

== Distribution and habitat ==
Pentachlaena latifolia is known only from the central regions of Vakinankaratra and Amoron'i Mania. Its habitat is subhumid forest from 1,000 m (3,300 ft) to about 2,500 m (8,200 ft) altitude.
