= Xerochlamys coriacea =

Conservation status
- Vulnerable (IUCN 3.1)

Scientific classification
- Kingdom: Plantae
- Clade: Tracheophytes
- Clade: Angiosperms
- Clade: Eudicots
- Clade: Rosids
- Order: Malvales
- Family: Sarcolaenaceae
- Genus: Xerochlamys
- Species: X. coriacea

Binomial name
- Xerochlamys coriacea Hong-Wa

Species of tree

Xerochlamys coriacea is a tree in the family Sarcolaenaceae. It is endemic to Madagascar.

== Description ==
Xerochlamys coriacea grows as a tree up to 8 metres (30 ft) tall with a trunk diameter of up to 20 cm (8 in). Its light green coriaceous leaves are elliptic to ovate in shape and measure up to 6 cm (2 in) long. The tree's flowers are solitary or in inflorescences of two or three flowers, with white petals. The ovoid fruits measure up to 1.25 cm (0.5 in) long.

== Distribution and habitat ==
Xerochlamys coriacea is only found in the central southern regions of Haute Matsiatra, Androy and Anosy. Its habitat is subhumid to dry forests from 450 metres (1,500 ft) to 1,200 m (4,000 ft) altitude. The conservation status of the species is vulnerable.
