= Eremolaena rotundifolia =

Conservation status
- Least Concern (IUCN 3.1)

Scientific classification
- Kingdom: Plantae
- Clade: Tracheophytes
- Clade: Angiosperms
- Clade: Eudicots
- Clade: Rosids
- Order: Malvales
- Family: Sarcolaenaceae
- Genus: Eremolaena
- Species: E. rotundifolia

Binomial name
- Eremolaena rotundifolia (F.Gérard) Danguy

Synonyms
- Rhodolaena rotundifolia F.Gérard

Species of flowering plant

Eremolaena rotundifolia is a plant in the family Sarcolaenaceae. It is endemic to Madagascar. The specific epithet rotundifolia means 'round leaves'.

== Description ==
Eremolaena rotundifolia grows as a shrub or tree. Its chartaceous leaves measure up to 5 cm (2 in) long. The inflorescences bear a single flower.

== Distribution and habitat ==
Eremolaena rotundifolia is known from the eastern regions of Sava, Atsimo-Atsinanana, Vatovavy-Fitovinany, Analanjirofo, Atsinanana and Anosy. Its habitat is humid coastal forest from sea-level to about 500 m (1,600 ft) altitude. Some subpopulations are in protected areas.
