= Schizolaena cavacoana =

Conservation status
- Endangered (IUCN 3.1)

Scientific classification
- Kingdom: Plantae
- Clade: Tracheophytes
- Clade: Angiosperms
- Clade: Eudicots
- Clade: Rosids
- Order: Malvales
- Family: Sarcolaenaceae
- Genus: Schizolaena
- Species: S. cavacoana

Binomial name
- Schizolaena cavacoana Lowry, G.E.Schatz, J.-F.Leroy & A.-E.Wolf

Species of tree

Schizolaena cavacoana is a tree in the family Sarcolaenaceae. It is endemic to Madagascar. The specific epithet is for the botanist Alberto Judice Leote Cavaco.

== Description ==
Schizolaena cavacoana grows as a large tree up to 35 metres (110 ft) tall with a trunk diameter of up to 100 cm (40 in). Its subcoriaceous leaves are elliptic to ovate in shape and are coloured grayish brown above and chocolate brown below. They measure up to 14 cm (5.5 in) long. The inflorescences have 10 to 20 flowers, each with five petals. The roundish fruits are yellow and measure up to 1.4 cm (0.6 in) in diameter.

== Distribution and habitat ==
Schizolaena cavacoana is known only from the northeastern regions of Sava and Analanjirofo. Its habitat is humid forest to 1,000 m (3,300 ft) altitude.
