= Schizolaena isaloensis =

Conservation status
- Endangered (IUCN 3.1)

Scientific classification
- Kingdom: Plantae
- Clade: Tracheophytes
- Clade: Angiosperms
- Clade: Eudicots
- Clade: Rosids
- Order: Malvales
- Family: Sarcolaenaceae
- Genus: Schizolaena
- Species: S. isaloensis

Binomial name
- Schizolaena isaloensis Rabeh. & Lowry

Species of tree

Schizolaena isaloensis is a tree in the family Sarcolaenaceae. It is endemic to Madagascar. The specific epithet refers to Isalo National Park, near where the species was identified.

== Description ==
Schizolaena isaloensis grows as a tree up to 10 m (30 ft) tall. The bark is thick and spongy. Its subcoriaceous leaves are elliptic to ovate or obovate in shape and coloured dark green above and pale green below. They measure up to 4 cm (1.6 in) long. The inflorescences of one to three axes each bear one or two flowers each with three sepals and five white petals. A light green involucre hides the young fruit. Specimen notes found "young growth or coppicing plants somewhat glabrous; mature plants tomentose".

== Distribution and habitat ==
Schizolaena isaloensis is known only from the south central regions of Ihorombe and Atsimo-Andrefana, specifically within and just beyond the southern limit of Isalo National Park and near the RN7 road. Its habitat is the central region's Tapia woodlands which are often severely degraded; the recorded specimens occurred in open grassland.

== Conservation ==
Schizolaena isaloensis has been assessed as endangered on the IUCN Red List. Its habitat is threatened by wildfires and by local harvesting for wood products. Some species subpopulations are in Isalo National Park, affording a level of protecttion.

In 2009, Schizolaena isaloensis was recorded as having very low numbers – at most 50 mature individuals.
