= Sarcolaena eriophora =

Conservation status
- Near Threatened (IUCN 3.1)

Scientific classification
- Kingdom: Plantae
- Clade: Tracheophytes
- Clade: Angiosperms
- Clade: Eudicots
- Clade: Rosids
- Order: Malvales
- Family: Sarcolaenaceae
- Genus: Sarcolaena
- Species: S. eriophora

Binomial name
- Sarcolaena eriophora Thouars

Species of flowering plant

Sarcolaena eriophora is a species of plant in the Sarcolaenaceae family. It is endemic to Madagascar. Its natural habitats are subtropical or tropical moist lowland forests and sandy shores. It is threatened by habitat loss.
