= Schizolaena parvipetala =

Conservation status
- Endangered (IUCN 3.1)

Scientific classification
- Kingdom: Plantae
- Clade: Tracheophytes
- Clade: Angiosperms
- Clade: Eudicots
- Clade: Rosids
- Order: Malvales
- Family: Sarcolaenaceae
- Genus: Schizolaena
- Species: S. parvipetala

Binomial name
- Schizolaena parvipetala Randrian. & Hong-Wa

Species of flowering plant

Schizolaena parvipetala is a plant in the family Sarcolaenaceae. It is endemic to Madagascar. The specific epithet parvipetala means 'small flowers'.

== Description ==
Schizolaena parvipetala grows as a shrub or small tree up to 6 m (20 ft) tall. Its twigs are glabrous, occasionally pubescent with small lenticels. The leaves are elliptic to ovate in shape. They are coloured medium brown above and light brown below, measuring up to 6 cm (2 in) long. The inflorescences bear two to four flowers, each with three sepals and five white petals. The species produces fruits in February.

== Distribution and habitat ==
Schizolaena parvipetala is known only from the southeastern coastal region of Anosy. Its habitat is lowland humid forest from 28–179 m (92–587 ft) altitude.

== Conservation ==
Schizolaena parvipetala has been assessed as endangered on the IUCN Red List. Its habitat is threatened by logging, wildfires and by shifting agricultural activities. The two subpopulations of the species are within the Tsitongambarika protected area.
