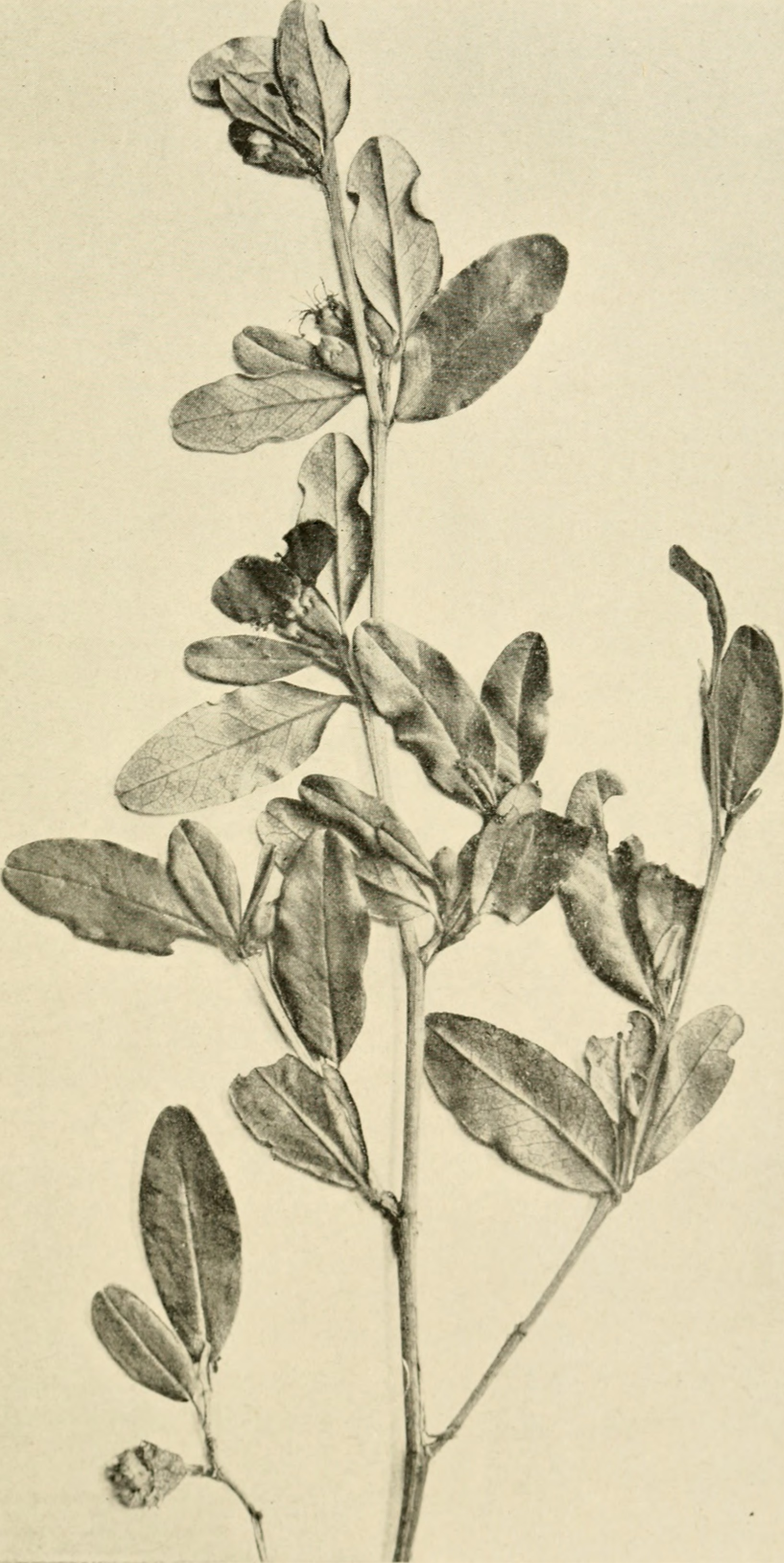

Conservation status
- Endangered (IUCN 3.1)

Scientific classification
- Kingdom: Plantae
- Clade: Tracheophytes
- Clade: Angiosperms
- Clade: Eudicots
- Clade: Rosids
- Order: Malvales
- Family: Sarcolaenaceae
- Genus: Xerochlamys
- Species: X. elliptica

Binomial name
- Xerochlamys elliptica F.Gérard

= Xerochlamys elliptica =

Species of tree

Xerochlamys elliptica is a tree in the family Sarcolaenaceae. It is endemic to Madagascar.

== Description ==
Xerochlamys elliptica grows as a small tree up to 8 metres (30 ft) tall with a trunk diameter of up to 20 cm (8 in). Its dark green coriaceous leaves are elliptic in shape and measure up to 4 cm (2 in) long. The tree's flowers are usually solitary or sometimes in inflorescences of two flowers, with white, or rarely pinkish, petals. The round fruits measure up to 0.9 cm (0.4 in) long.

== Distribution and habitat ==
Xerochlamys elliptica is only found in the central regions of Vakinankaratra and Amoron'i Mania. Its habitat is subhumid evergreen forests from 1,300 metres (4,300 ft) to 1,600 m (5,200 ft) altitude.

== Threats ==
Xerochlamys elliptica is threatened by deforestation due to wildfires and mining. No populations are currently within protected areas.
