= Eremolaena darainensis =

Conservation status
- Endangered (IUCN 3.1)

Scientific classification
- Kingdom: Plantae
- Clade: Tracheophytes
- Clade: Angiosperms
- Clade: Eudicots
- Clade: Rosids
- Order: Malvales
- Family: Sarcolaenaceae
- Genus: Eremolaena
- Species: E. darainensis

Binomial name
- Eremolaena darainensis Nusb. & Lowry

Species of tree

Eremolaena darainensis is a tree in the family Sarcolaenaceae. It is endemic to Madagascar. It is named for its native commune of Daraina.

== Description ==
Eremolaena darainensis grows as a tree up to 12 metres (40 ft) tall. Its branches are red to gray brown and lenticellate. The bark is smooth. Its ovate to obovate leaves are chartaceous and measure up to 5.5 cm (2 in) long. They are green above and white below. The flowers are solitary with five green sepals and five white petals. Fruits are unknown.

== Distribution and habitat ==
Eremolaena darainensis is known only from the northern region of Sava. Its habitat is semi-deciduous forest on steep slopes from 250 m (800 ft) to 550 m (1,800 ft) altitude.

== Threats ==
Eremolaena darainensis is currently known only from five subpopulations in Loky-Manambato forest. The species is only temporarily protected so further habitat decline is likely. The species' conservation status is assessed as endangered.
