= Perrierodendron capuronii =

Conservation status
- Endangered (IUCN 3.1)

Scientific classification
- Kingdom: Plantae
- Clade: Tracheophytes
- Clade: Angiosperms
- Clade: Eudicots
- Clade: Rosids
- Order: Malvales
- Family: Sarcolaenaceae
- Genus: Perrierodendron
- Species: P. capuronii

Binomial name
- Perrierodendron capuronii J.-F.Leroy, Lowry, Haev., Labat & G.E.Schatz

Species of tree

Perrierodendron capuronii is a tree in the family Sarcolaenaceae. It is endemic to Madagascar. The specific epithet is for the French botanist René Capuron.

== Description ==
Perrierodendron capuronii grows as a tree up to 20 metres (70 ft) tall. Its chartaceous to subcoriaceous leaves are obovate in shape. They are coloured brown above, greenish brown below and measure up to 9 cm (4 in) long. The inflorescences bear one to seven flowers, each with five sepals and five petals. The smooth fruits are obovoid in shape and measure up to 1.3 cm (0.5 in) long.

== Distribution and habitat ==
Perrierodendron capuronii is known only from the eastern regions of Sava, Alaotra-Mangoro and Atsinanana. Its habitat is humid and subhumid forests from 500 metres (1,600 ft) to 1,000 m (3,300 ft) altitude.
