= Schizolaena milleri =

Conservation status
- Endangered (IUCN 3.1)

Scientific classification
- Kingdom: Plantae
- Clade: Tracheophytes
- Clade: Angiosperms
- Clade: Eudicots
- Clade: Rosids
- Order: Malvales
- Family: Sarcolaenaceae
- Genus: Schizolaena
- Species: S. milleri

Binomial name
- Schizolaena milleri Lowry, G.E.Schatz, J.-F.Leroy & A.-E.Wolf

Species of plant

Schizolaena milleri is a plant in the family Sarcolaenaceae. It is endemic to Madagascar. It is named for the botanical collector James Spencer Miller.

== Description ==
Schizolaena milleri grows as a shrub or tree up to 15 m (50 ft) tall. Its papery leaves are elliptic to ovate in shape and are coloured grayish green above, brown tinged red below. They measure up to 7.5 cm (3 in) long. The inflorescences typically bear four flowers, each with three sepals and five bright pink petals. The fruits are roundish and measure up to 0.6 cm (0.2 in) in diameter.

== Distribution and habitat ==
Schizolaena milleri is confined to the east of the country, from the region of Sava south to Atsinanana. Its habitat is forests on sand by the sea to lowland humid evergreen forests, from sea level to 150 m (500 ft) altitude.

== Conservation ==
Schizolaena milleri has been assessed as endangered on the IUCN Red List. Its habitat is threatened by logging and wildfires and by conversion of land for urbanisation and agriculture. However, the species is present in two protected areas, including Masoala National Park.
