= Rhodolaena altivola =

Conservation status
- Critically Endangered (IUCN 3.1)

Scientific classification
- Kingdom: Plantae
- Clade: Tracheophytes
- Clade: Angiosperms
- Clade: Eudicots
- Clade: Rosids
- Order: Malvales
- Family: Sarcolaenaceae
- Genus: Rhodolaena
- Species: R. altivola

Binomial name
- Rhodolaena altivola Thouars

Species of tree

Rhodolaena altivola is a tree in the family Sarcolaenaceae. It is endemic to Madagascar. The naturalist and explorer Alfred Russel Wallace described it as "among the most magnificent flowering plants in the world".

== Description ==
Rhodolaena altivola grows as a small to medium-sized tree. It has medium, ovate leaves. The inflorescences have one or two flowers on a long stem. Individual flowers are very large with five sepals and five purple-red petals, measuring up 5 cm (2 in) long. The fruits are large and woody.

== Distribution and habitat ==
Rhodolaena altivola is only found in the eastern regions of Atsinanana and Analanjirofo. Its habitat is humid to subhumid evergreen forests from 200 m (700 ft) to 1,000 m (3,300 ft) altitude.

== Threats ==
Rhodolaena altivola is threatened by shifting cultivation and wildfires. Its future population decline due to habitat loss is predicted at more than 80%. No population of the trees is currently in a protected area. The status of the species is critically endangered.
