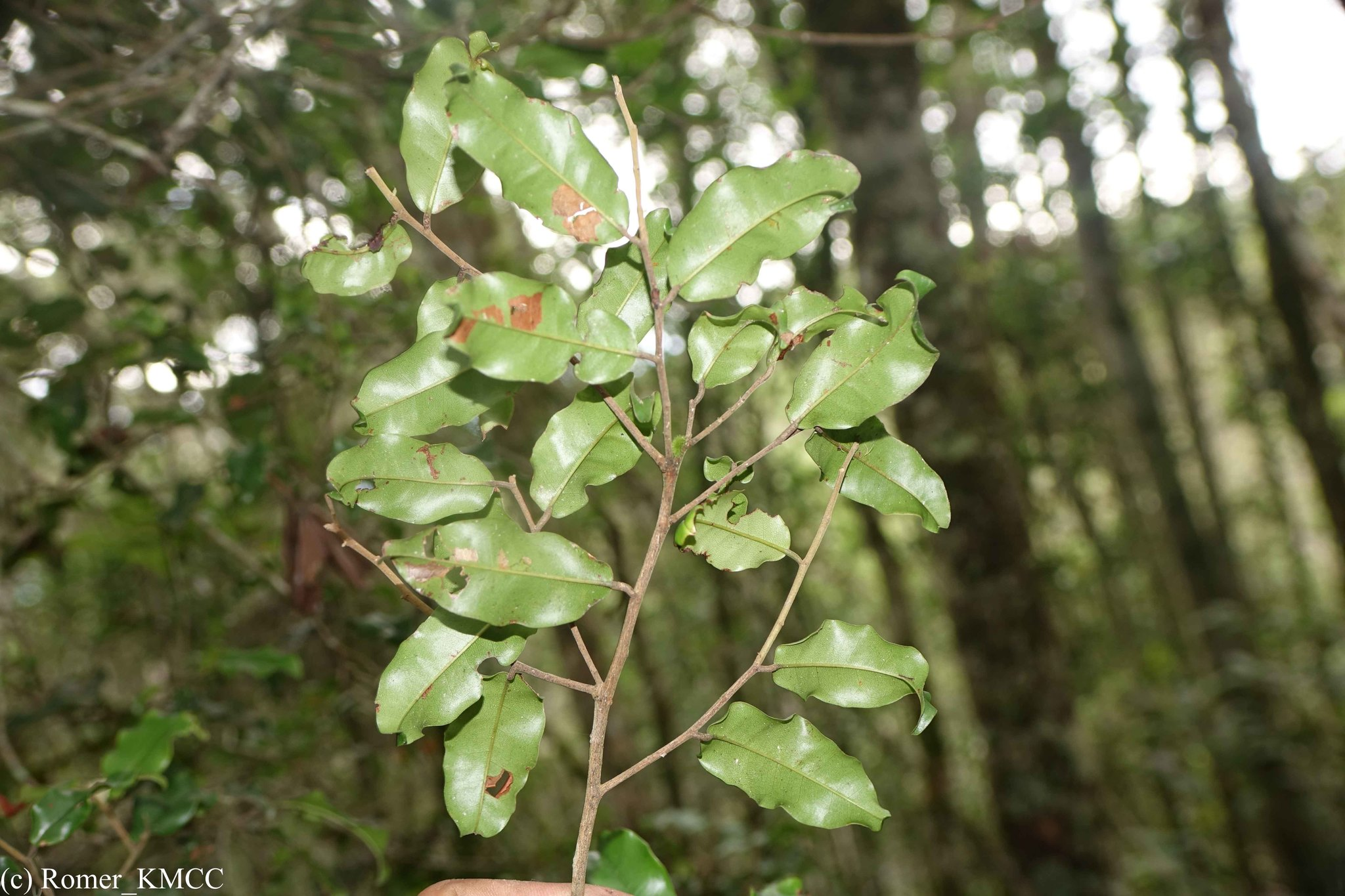

Conservation status
- Least Concern (IUCN 3.1)

Scientific classification
- Kingdom: Plantae
- Clade: Tracheophytes
- Clade: Angiosperms
- Clade: Eudicots
- Clade: Rosids
- Order: Malvales
- Family: Sarcolaenaceae
- Genus: Rhodolaena
- Species: R. bakeriana

Binomial name
- Rhodolaena bakeriana Baill.

= Rhodolaena bakeriana =

Species of tree

Rhodolaena bakeriana is a tree in the family Sarcolaenaceae. It is endemic to Madagascar.

== Description ==
Rhodolaena bakeriana grows as a medium-sized tree. Its twigs are hairy. It has small to medium leaves, obovate, elliptic or oblong in shape. The inflorescences have one or two flowers on a long stem. Individual flowers are very large with five sepals and five purple-red petals, measuring up 5 centimetres (2 in) long. The fruits are medium-sized and woody. The fruits may be dispersed by lemurs.

== Taxonomy ==
The Latin specific epithet Bakeriana is in honor of the English botanist John Gilbert Baker.

== Distribution and habitat ==
Rhodolaena bakeriana is only found in the central to north central regions of Analamanga, Sava, Haute Matsiatra and Alaotra-Mangoro. Its habitat is humid to subhumid evergreen forests from 600–1,600 metres (2,000–5,200 ft) altitude.

== Threats ==
Rhodolaena bakeriana is threatened by timber exploitation. Its habitat is also at risk from clearing for agriculture.
