= Sarcolaena grandiflora =

Conservation status
- Vulnerable (IUCN 3.1)

Scientific classification
- Kingdom: Plantae
- Clade: Tracheophytes
- Clade: Angiosperms
- Clade: Eudicots
- Clade: Rosids
- Order: Malvales
- Family: Sarcolaenaceae
- Genus: Sarcolaena
- Species: S. grandiflora

Binomial name
- Sarcolaena grandiflora Thouars

Species of flowering plant

Sarcolaena grandiflora is a species of plant in the Sarcolaenaceae family. It is endemic to Madagascar. Its natural habitat is sandy shores. It is threatened by habitat loss.
