= Pentachlaena vestita =

Scientific classification
- Kingdom: Plantae
- Clade: Tracheophytes
- Clade: Angiosperms
- Clade: Eudicots
- Clade: Rosids
- Order: Malvales
- Family: Sarcolaenaceae
- Genus: Pentachlaena
- Species: P. vestita

Binomial name
- Pentachlaena vestita Andriamih., Lowry & G.E.Schatz

Species of flowering plant

Pentachlaena vestita is a plant in the family Sarcolaenaceae. It is endemic to Madagascar. The specific epithet vestita means 'blanketed', referring to the hairy indument on the underside of the leaves and also on stems, fruits and other surfaces.

== Description ==
Pentachlaena vestita grows as a shrub up to 1.5 metres (5 ft) tall. Its coriaceous leaves are ovate to oblong in shape and measure up to 13.8 centimetres (5 in) long. The inflorescences typically bear up two flowers, occasionally one flower, each with five sepals and five white petals. The obloid fruits are orangish to brown and measure up to 3 centimetres (1 in) long.

== Distribution and habitat ==
Pentachlaena vestita is known only from the central region of Amoron'i Mania. Its habitat is bushland or wooded grassland from 1,250–1,500 m (4,000–5,000 ft) altitude.

== Threats ==
Pentachlaena vestita is threatened by fires, some man-made, which stunt the plant's growth. The species is confined to a relatively small area. The preliminary status is Endangered.
