= Pentachlaena betamponensis =

Conservation status
- Critically Endangered (IUCN 3.1)

Scientific classification
- Kingdom: Plantae
- Clade: Tracheophytes
- Clade: Angiosperms
- Clade: Eudicots
- Clade: Rosids
- Order: Malvales
- Family: Sarcolaenaceae
- Genus: Pentachlaena
- Species: P. betamponensis

Binomial name
- Pentachlaena betamponensis Lowry, Haev., Labat & G.E.Schatz

Species of flowering plant

Pentachlaena betamponensis is a tree in the family Sarcolaenaceae. It is endemic to Madagascar. It is named for the Betampona Reserve where the species is found.

== Description ==
Pentachlaena betamponensis grows as a tree of unknown height. Its coriaceous leaves are obovate in shape and coloured brown above and greenish brown below. They measure up to 5 cm (2 in) long. The inflorescences bear up to 10 flowers, each with five sepals and five petals. Fruits are unknown.

== Distribution and habitat ==
Pentachlaena betamponensis is known only from the eastern region of Atsinanana, where it confined to the Betampona Reserve. Its habitat is humid forest from 350–580 m (1,100–1,900 ft) altitude.

== Conservation ==
Pentachlaena betamponensis has been assessed as critically endangered on the IUCN Red List. It has only one known subpopulation. The species is threatened by logging and cyclones.
