= Sarcolaena isaloensis =

Conservation status
- Critically Endangered (IUCN 3.1)

Scientific classification
- Kingdom: Plantae
- Clade: Tracheophytes
- Clade: Angiosperms
- Clade: Eudicots
- Clade: Rosids
- Order: Malvales
- Family: Sarcolaenaceae
- Genus: Sarcolaena
- Species: S. isaloensis

Binomial name
- Sarcolaena isaloensis Randrianasolo & Miller

Species of flowering plant

Sarcolaena isaloensis is a species of plant in the Sarcolaenaceae family. It is endemic to Madagascar. Its natural habitat is subtropical or tropical moist shrubland. It is threatened by habitat loss and is only known from Isalo National Park.
