= Schizolaena raymondii =

Conservation status
- Critically Endangered (IUCN 3.1)

Scientific classification
- Kingdom: Plantae
- Clade: Tracheophytes
- Clade: Angiosperms
- Clade: Eudicots
- Clade: Rosids
- Order: Malvales
- Family: Sarcolaenaceae
- Genus: Schizolaena
- Species: S. raymondii

Binomial name
- Schizolaena raymondii Lowry & Rabeh.

Species of flowering plant

Schizolaena raymondii is a tree in the family Sarcolaenaceae. It is endemic to Madagascar. It is named for the botanist Raymond Rabevohitra.

== Description ==
Schizolaena raymondii grows as a tree up to 14 m (50 ft) tall. Its subcoriaceous leaves are elliptic to obovate in shape and coloured greenish brown above and khaki green below. They measure up to 7.5 cm (3 in) long. The inflorescences are found near branch tips, each bearing up to 12 flowers. Each flower has three sepals and five petals. The roundish fruits measure up to 1.6 cm (0.6 in) in diameter.

== Distribution and habitat ==
Schizolaena raymondii is known only from the northern region of Sava where it is restricted to a single locality in the Ambondrobe forest. Its habitat is seaside forest from 16–67 m (52–220 ft) altitude.

== Conservation ==
Schizolaena raymondii has been assessed as critically endangered on the IUCN Red List. It has a single subpopulation, in a small area of the Ambondrobe forest of Sava. Its habitat is threatened by deforestation and fires and is not part of any protected area.
