= Eremolaena humblotiana =

Conservation status
- Vulnerable (IUCN 3.1)

Scientific classification
- Kingdom: Plantae
- Clade: Tracheophytes
- Clade: Angiosperms
- Clade: Eudicots
- Clade: Rosids
- Order: Malvales
- Family: Sarcolaenaceae
- Genus: Eremolaena
- Species: E. humblotiana

Binomial name
- Eremolaena humblotiana Baill.

Species of flowering plant

Eremolaena humblotiana is a plant in the family Sarcolaenaceae. The species is endemic to Madagascar. It is named for the French naturalist Léon Humblot.

== Description ==
Eremolaena humblotiana grows as a shrub or tree. Its subcoriaceous leaves may measure more than 9 cm (4 in) long. The inflorescences bear two flowers.

== Distribution and habitat ==
Eremolaena humblotiana is known only from the eastern regions of Alaotra-Mangoro, Analanjirofo and Atsinanana. Its habitat is humid and subhumid forest up to about 1,200 m (4,000 ft) altitude.

== Threats ==
Eremolaena humblotiana is threatened by logging, wildfires and tropical storms. Three subpopulations of the species are in protected areas: in the Betampona, Zahamena and Analalava Protected Areas of eastern Madagascar.
