= Rhodolaena leroyana =

Conservation status
- Vulnerable (IUCN 3.1)

Scientific classification
- Kingdom: Plantae
- Clade: Tracheophytes
- Clade: Angiosperms
- Clade: Eudicots
- Clade: Rosids
- Order: Malvales
- Family: Sarcolaenaceae
- Genus: Rhodolaena
- Species: R. leroyana

Binomial name
- Rhodolaena leroyana G.E.Schatz, Lowry & A.-E.Wolf

Species of flowering plant

Rhodolaena leroyana is a plant in the family Sarcolaenaceae. It is endemic to Madagascar. The specific epithet is for the botanist Jean-François Leroy.

== Description ==
Rhodolaena leroyana grows as a shrub or small tree up to 8 m (30 ft) tall. The twigs are hairless. Its subcoriaceous leaves are elliptic to obovate in shape and measure up to 12 cm (5 in) long. The solitary inflorescences have one or two flowers on a peduncle measuring up to 8 centimetres (3 in) long. Individual flowers are large with five sepals and five purple-pink petals, measuring up to 5 centimetres (2 in) long. The fruits are large and woody, with a fleshy involucre.

== Distribution and habitat ==
Rhodolaena leroyana is known only from the region of Atsinanana where it is confined to Betampona Reserve. Its habitat is humid evergreen forest from 300 metres (1,000 ft) to 550 m (1,800 ft) altitude. The conservation status of the species is vulnerable.
