= Schizolaena cauliflora =

Conservation status
- Least Concern (IUCN 3.1)

Scientific classification
- Kingdom: Plantae
- Clade: Tracheophytes
- Clade: Angiosperms
- Clade: Eudicots
- Clade: Rosids
- Order: Malvales
- Family: Sarcolaenaceae
- Genus: Schizolaena
- Species: S. cauliflora

Binomial name
- Schizolaena cauliflora Thouars

Species of tree

Schizolaena cauliflora is a tree in the family Sarcolaenaceae. It is endemic to Madagascar. The specific epithet cauliflora means 'stem-flowered', referring to the flowers being directly attached to the stem.

== Description ==
Schizolaena cauliflora grows as a tree up to 15 metres (50 ft) tall. It is the only species in the genus to bear inflorescences directly on the trunk or branches.

== Distribution and habitat ==
Schizolaena cauliflora is known only from the eastern regions of Sava, Atsimo-Atsinanana, Vatovavy-Fitovinany, Analanjirofo and Atsinanana. Its habitat is humid coastal forests from sea-level to 1,000 m (3,300 ft) altitude. Some subpopulations of the trees are within protected areas.
