= Rhodolaena macrocarpa =

Conservation status
- Endangered (IUCN 3.1)

Scientific classification
- Kingdom: Plantae
- Clade: Tracheophytes
- Clade: Angiosperms
- Clade: Eudicots
- Clade: Rosids
- Order: Malvales
- Family: Sarcolaenaceae
- Genus: Rhodolaena
- Species: R. macrocarpa

Binomial name
- Rhodolaena macrocarpa G.E.Schatz, Lowry & A.-E.Wolf

Species of tree

Rhodolaena macrocarpa is a tree in the family Sarcolaenaceae. It is endemic to Madagascar. The specific epithet macrocarpa means 'large-fruited'.

== Description ==
Rhodolaena macrocarpa grows as a tree up to 10 metres (30 ft) tall. The branches are glabrous. Its leaves, also glabrous, are elliptic in shape, dry olive green and measure up to 11.2 centimetres (4 in) long. The inflorescences have a single flower, uniquely for the genus, on a peduncle measuring up to 7.5 cm (3 in) long. Individual flowers are large with five sepals and five purple-red petals, measuring up to 5 cm (2 in) long. The round fruits are large and woody, measuring up to 1.7 cm (1 in) in diameter, with a fleshy involucre. The fruit is the largest of the genus.

== Distribution and habitat ==
Rhodolaena macrocarpa is known only from the northern region of Sava. Its habitat is humid evergreen forest at around 150 metres (500 ft) altitude.

== Threats ==
Rhodolaena macrocarpa is threatened by timber exploitation. Future population decline of the tree due to habitat loss is predicted at greater than 80%. The single population of the species is not in a protected area. The conservation status of the species is endangered.
