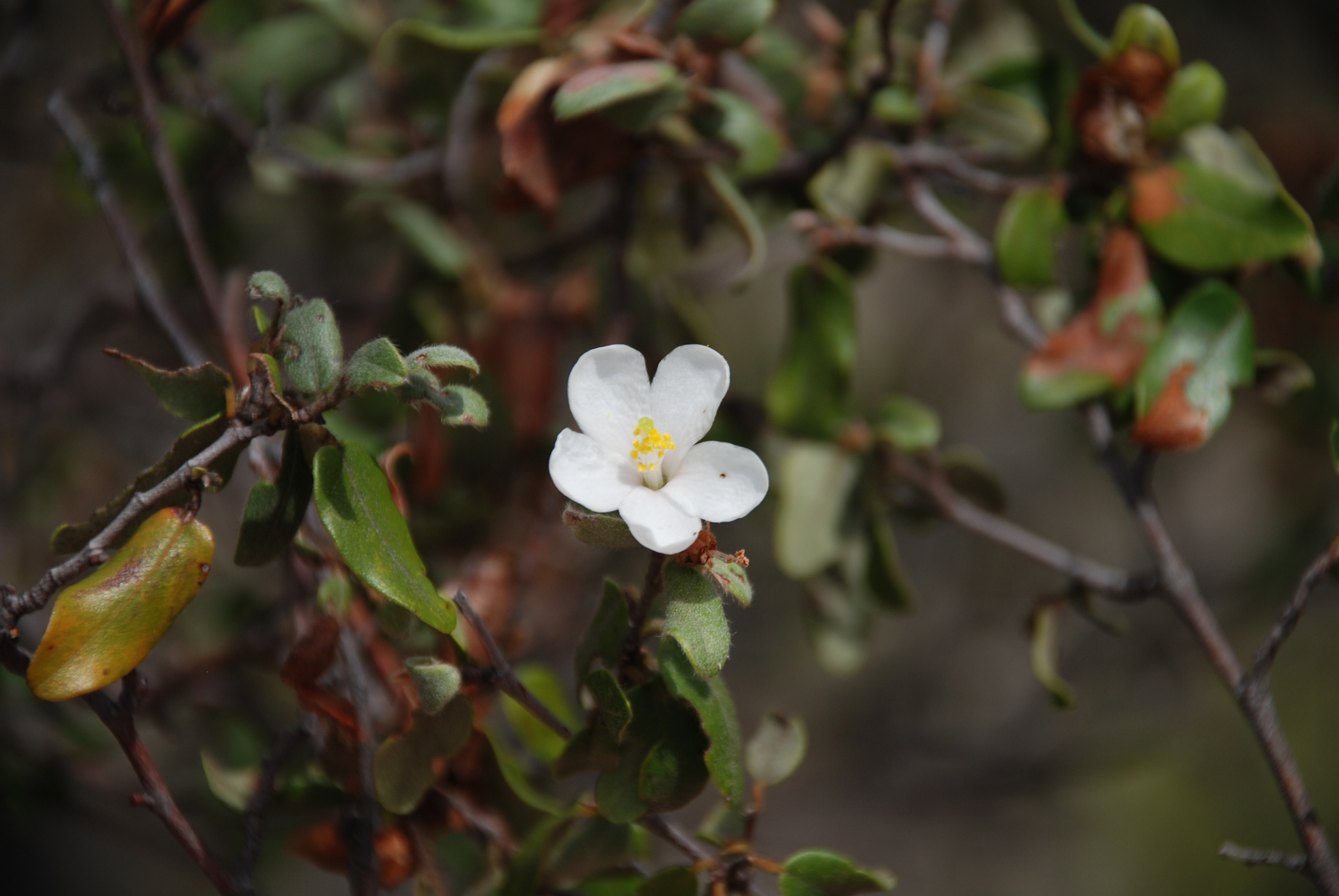

Conservation status
- Endangered (IUCN 3.1)

Scientific classification
- Kingdom: Plantae
- Clade: Tracheophytes
- Clade: Angiosperms
- Clade: Eudicots
- Clade: Rosids
- Order: Malvales
- Family: Sarcolaenaceae
- Genus: Xerochlamys
- Species: X. undulata

Binomial name
- Xerochlamys undulata Hong-Wa

= Xerochlamys undulata =

Species of shrub

Xerochlamys undulata is a shrub in the family Sarcolaenaceae. It is endemic to Madagascar.

== Description ==
Xerochlamys undulata grows as a shrub with pubescent twigs. Its leaves are bright green above, dull green on the underside. They are elliptic in shape and measure up to 3.5 cm (1 in) long. The tree's flowers are solitary or in inflorescences of two flowers, with yellow to white petals. The roundish to ovoid fruits measure up to 1.1 cm (0.4 in) long with brown seeds.

== Distribution and habitat ==
Xerochlamys undulata is only found in the central regions of Ihorombe and Atsimo-Andrefana. Its habitat is on sandstone from 500 metres (1,600 ft) to 1,500 m (5,000 ft) altitude. One population of the plants occurs in Isalo National Park. The preliminary status of the species is endangered.
