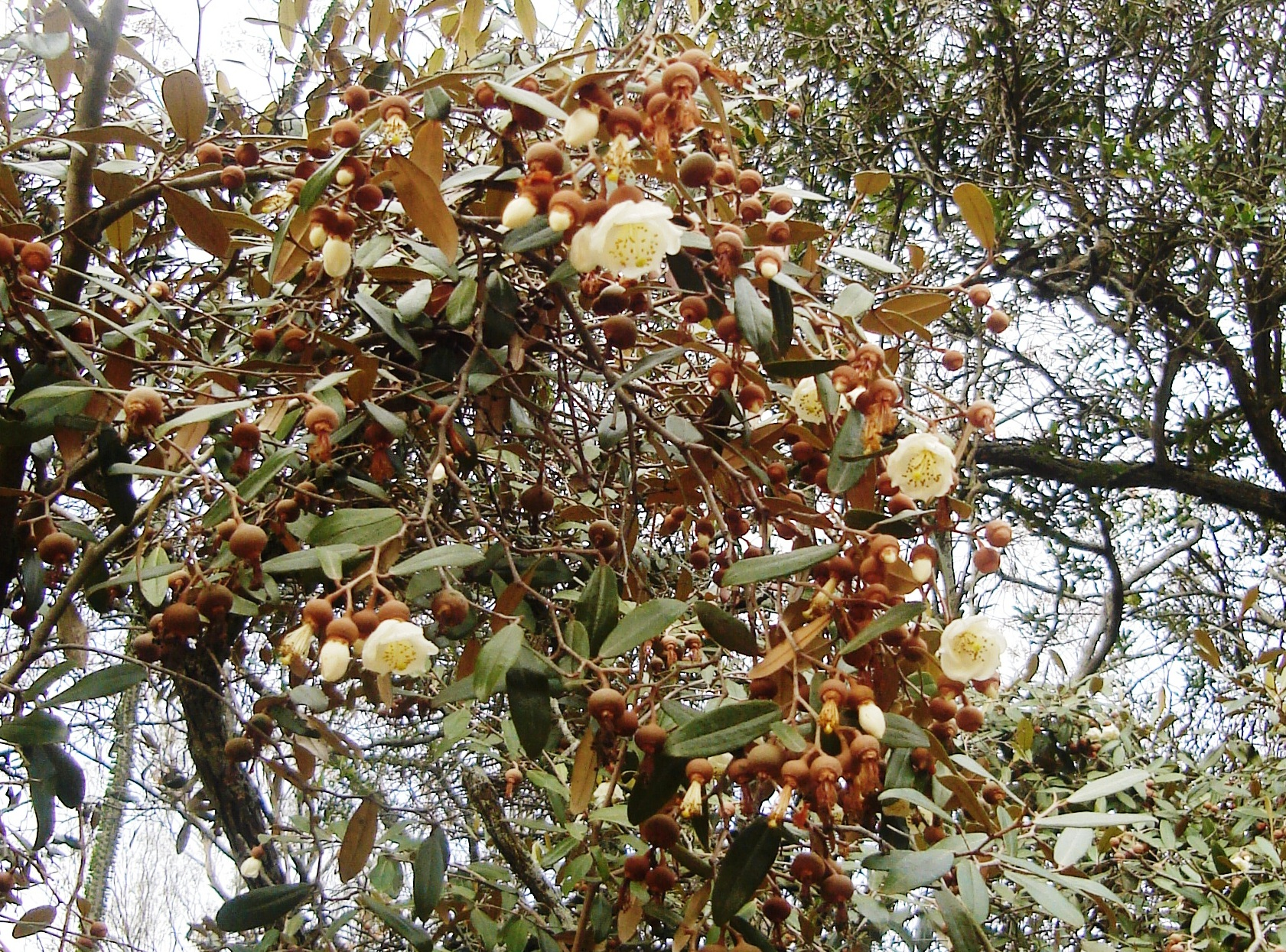
- Sarcolaena oblongifolia, Tsimbazaza Botanical Garden, Antananarivo

Conservation status
- Least Concern (IUCN 3.1)

Scientific classification
- Kingdom: Plantae
- Clade: Tracheophytes
- Clade: Angiosperms
- Clade: Eudicots
- Clade: Rosids
- Order: Malvales
- Family: Sarcolaenaceae
- Genus: Sarcolaena
- Species: S. oblongifolia

Binomial name
- Sarcolaena oblongifolia F.Gérard

= Sarcolaena oblongifolia =

Species of flowering plant

Sarcolaena oblongifolia is a species of plant in the Sarcolaenaceae family. It is endemic to Madagascar. Its natural habitats are subtropical or tropical moist lowland forests and subtropical or tropical moist shrubland. It is threatened by habitat loss.
