= Rhodolaena coriacea =

Conservation status
- Least Concern (IUCN 3.1)

Scientific classification
- Kingdom: Plantae
- Clade: Tracheophytes
- Clade: Angiosperms
- Clade: Eudicots
- Clade: Rosids
- Order: Malvales
- Family: Sarcolaenaceae
- Genus: Rhodolaena
- Species: R. coriacea

Binomial name
- Rhodolaena coriacea G.E.Schatz, Lowry & A.-E.Wolf

Species of tree

Rhodolaena coriacea is a tree in the family Sarcolaenaceae. It is endemic to Madagascar. The specific epithet coriacea means 'leathery', referring to the leaves.

== Description ==
Rhodolaena coriacea grows as a tree from 5 to 25 metres (20 to 80 ft) tall. Its large, coriaceous leaves are elliptic in shape and measure up to 14.5 centimetres (6 in) long. The inflorescences have one or two flowers on a long peduncle. Individual flowers are large with five sepals and five purple-pink petals, measuring up 5 cm (2 in) long. The fruits are medium-sized and woody, with a fleshy involucre. The involucre is reportedly eaten by lemurs, facilitating seed dispersal.

== Distribution and habitat ==
Rhodolaena coriacea is only found in the eastern regions of Sava, Vatovavy-Fitovinany, Alaotra-Mangoro and Analanjirofo. Its habitat is coastal and evergreen forests from 20 to 1,700 metres (100 to 5,600 ft) altitude.

== Threats ==
Rhodolaena coriacea is threatened by timber exploitation and threats to the lemur population. Future population decline of the tree due to habitat loss is predicted at 50% to 80%, though some subpopulations are considered secure in protected areas. Threats to lemurs would in turn affect the tree's reproduction due to their role in seed dispersal.

The timber is used in construction. Deforestation is a threat to this and other tree species. Due to shifting patterns of agriculture, deforestation is extensive outside of protected areas.
