= Mediusella =

Conservation status
- Endangered (IUCN 3.1)

Scientific classification
- Kingdom: Plantae
- Clade: Tracheophytes
- Clade: Angiosperms
- Clade: Eudicots
- Clade: Rosids
- Order: Malvales
- Family: Sarcolaenaceae
- Genus: Mediusella (Cavaco) Hutch. (1973)
- Species: M. bernieri

Binomial name
- Mediusella bernieri (Baill.) Hutch. (1973)

Synonyms
- Leptolaena bernieri Baill. (1886); Xerochlamys bernieri (Baill.) H.Perrier (1931)

Species of flowering plant

Mediusella bernieri is a species of flowering plant in the family Sarcolaenaceae. It is the sole species in genus Mediusella. It is a shrub or tree endemic to Madagascar.

== Description ==
Mediusella bernieri grows as a shrub or small tree up to 3 metres (10 ft) tall. It has a trunk diameter of up to 20 cm (8 in). Its bright green leaves are ovate in shape and measure up to 6 cm (2 in) long. The plant's flowers are usually in inflorescences of two or three flowers, each with white to yellow petals. The ovoid fruits measure up to 1.1 cm (0.4 in) long. Mediusella bernieri flowers and fruits from February to July.

== Distribution and habitat ==
Mediusella bernieri is only found in the far northern regions of Diana and Sava (the former Antsiranana Province). IUCN assessors identified nine subpopulations over an extent of occurrence of 3,055 square kilometres (1,200 sq mi). Its habitat is dry forests, on various rocky formations, from 50–300 m (200–1,000 ft) elevation.

== Threats ==
Mediusella bernieri is in decline due to habitat destruction from activities such as agriculture, mining, fires and wood harvesting. In 2019, it was assessed by the IUCN as Endangered. Although four (of nine) subpopulations of the species are within the protected areas of Andavakoeira-Andrafiamena and Loky Manambato, the species' decline continues due to the above activities.
