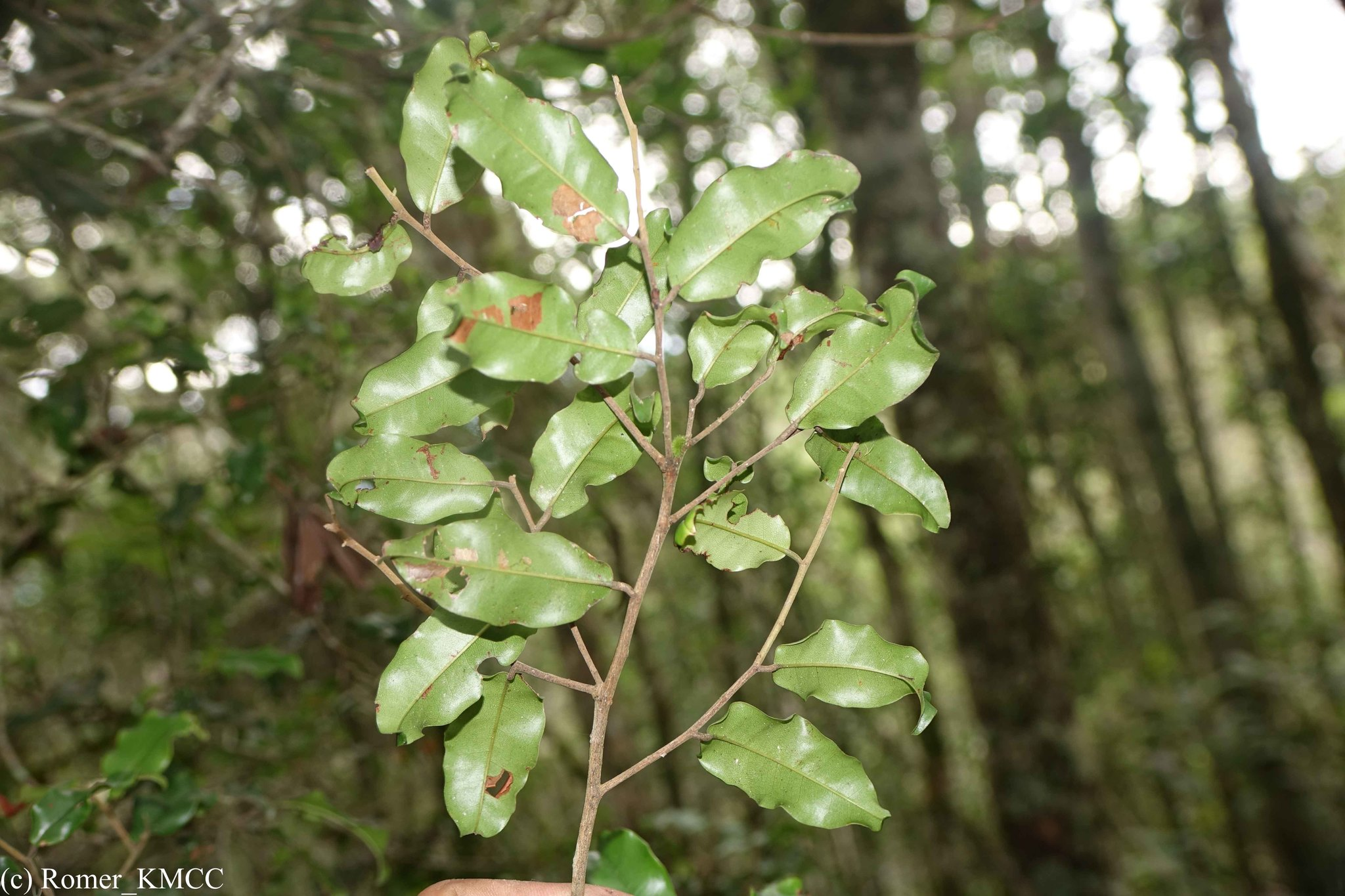
- Rhodolaena bakeriana

Scientific classification
- Kingdom: Plantae
- Clade: Tracheophytes
- Clade: Angiosperms
- Clade: Eudicots
- Clade: Rosids
- Order: Malvales
- Family: Sarcolaenaceae
- Genus: Rhodolaena; Thouars (1805)

Type species
- Rhodolaena altivola Thouars

Species
- See text

= Rhodolaena =

Family of shrubs and trees

Rhodolaena is a genus of trees and shrubs in the family Sarcolaenaceae. The species are all endemic to Madagascar. The monophyly of the genus is unresolved.

== Species ==
Seven species are recognised:

- Rhodolaena acutifolia Baker
- Rhodolaena altivola Thouars
- Rhodolaena bakeriana Baill.
- Rhodolaena coriacea G.E.Schatz, Lowry & A.-E.Wolf
- Rhodolaena humblotii Baill.
- Rhodolaena leroyana G.E.Schatz, Lowry & A.-E.Wolf
- Rhodolaena macrocarpa G.E.Schatz, Lowry & A.-E.Wolf
