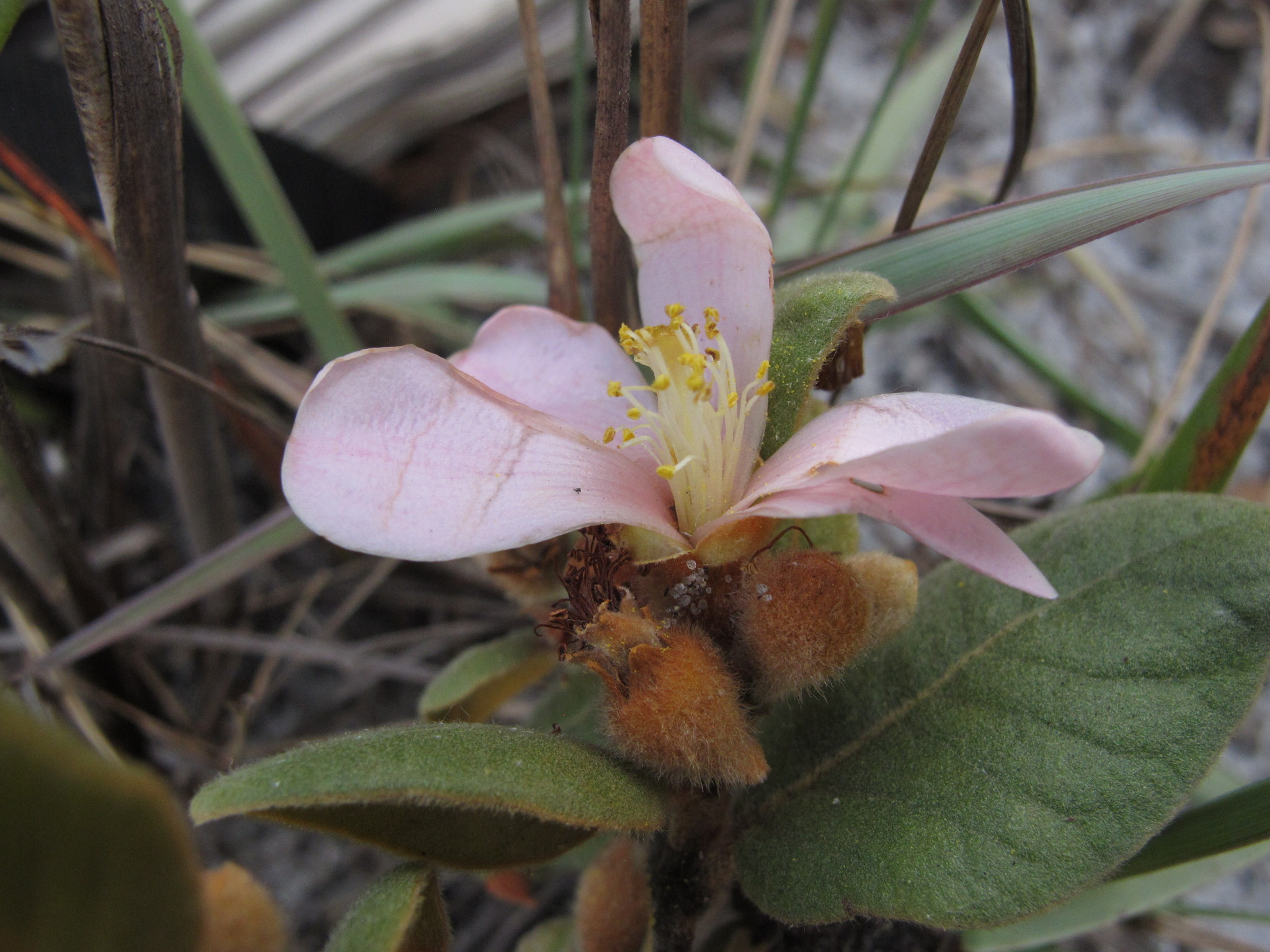
- Xerochlamys diospyroidea

Scientific classification
- Kingdom: Plantae
- Clade: Tracheophytes
- Clade: Angiosperms
- Clade: Eudicots
- Clade: Rosids
- Order: Malvales
- Family: Sarcolaenaceae
- Genus: Xerochlamys; Baker

= Xerochlamys =

Genus of flowering plants

Xerochlamys is a genus of trees and shrubs in the family Sarcolaenaceae. The species are all endemic to Madagascar.

== Species ==
As of December 2025, eight species were recognised:

- Xerochlamys bojeriana (Baill.) F.Gérard
- Xerochlamys coriacea Hong-Wa
- Xerochlamys diospyroidea (Baill.) F.Gérard
- Xerochlamys elliptica F.Gérard
- Xerochlamys itremoensis Hong-Wa, G.E.Schatz & Lowry
- Xerochlamys tampoketsensis F.Gérard
- Xerochlamys undulata Hong-Wa
- Xerochlamys villosa F.Gérard
