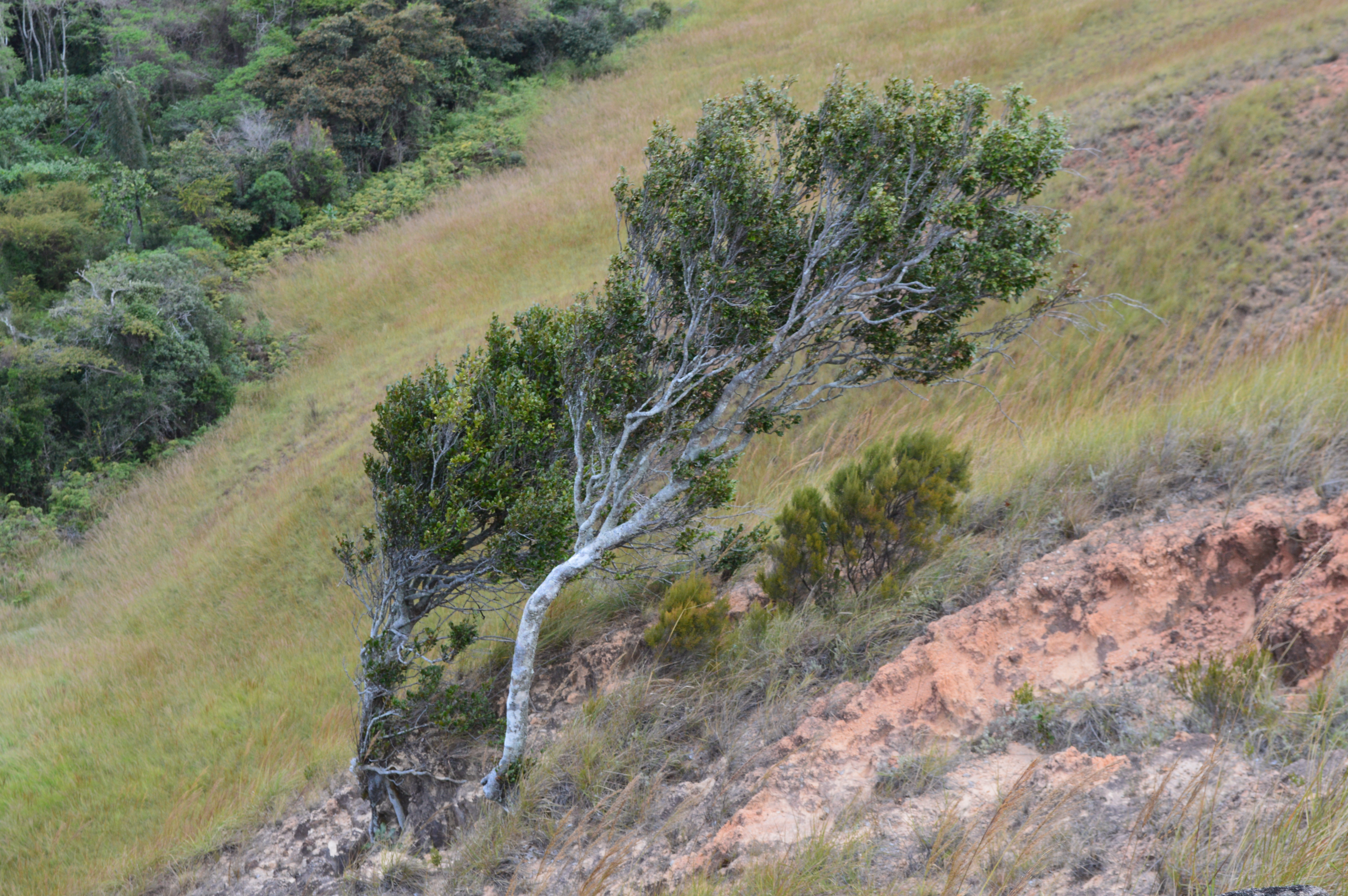
- Sohisika (Schizolaena tampoketsana)

Scientific classification
- Kingdom: Plantae
- Clade: Tracheophytes
- Clade: Angiosperms
- Clade: Eudicots
- Clade: Rosids
- Order: Malvales
- Family: Sarcolaenaceae
- Genus: Schizolaena; Thouars (1805)

= Schizolaena =

Family of shrubs and trees

Schizolaena is a genus of trees and shrubs in the family Sarcolaenaceae. They are endemic to Madagascar.

== Species ==
22 species are accepted.

- Schizolaena capuronii Lowry, G.E.Schatz, J.-F.Leroy & A.-E.Wolf
- Schizolaena cauliflora Thouars
- Schizolaena cavacoana Lowry, G.E.Schatz, J.-F.Leroy & A.-E.Wolf
- Schizolaena charlotteae Lowry & G.E.Schatz
- Schizolaena elongata Thouars
- Schizolaena exinvolucrata Baker
- Schizolaena gereaui Lowry, G.E.Schatz, J.-F.Leroy & A.-E.Wolf
- Schizolaena hystrix Capuron
- Schizolaena isaloensis Rabeh. & Lowry
- Schizolaena laurina Baill.
- Schizolaena manomboensis Lowry, G.E.Schatz, J.-F.Leroy & A.-E.Wolf
- Schizolaena masoalensis Lowry, G.E.Schatz, J.-F.Leroy & A.-E.Wolf
- Schizolaena microphylla H.Perrier
- Schizolaena milleri Lowry, G.E.Schatz, J.-F.Leroy & A.-E.Wolf
- Schizolaena parviflora (F.Gérard) H.Perrier
- Schizolaena parvipetala Randrian. & Hong-Wa
- Schizolaena pectinata Capuron
- Schizolaena raymondii Lowry & Rabeh.
- Schizolaena rosea Thouars
- Schizolaena tampoketsana Lowry, G.E.Schatz, J.-F.Leroy & A.-E.Wolf
- Schizolaena turkii Lowry, G.E.Schatz, J.-F.Leroy & A.-E.Wolf
- Schizolaena viscosa F.Gérard
