= Tabernaemontana capuronii =

Scientific classification
- Kingdom: Plantae
- Clade: Tracheophytes
- Clade: Angiosperms
- Clade: Eudicots
- Clade: Asterids
- Order: Gentianales
- Family: Apocynaceae
- Genus: Tabernaemontana
- Species: T. capuronii

Binomial name
- Tabernaemontana capuronii Leeuwenb.

Synonyms
- Capuronetta elegans Markgr.

Species of plant

Tabernaemontana capuronii is a species of plant in the family Apocynaceae. It is found in Madagascar.

The Latin specific epithet of capuronii is in honor of the French botanist René Capuron. It was first published in J. Ethno-Pharmacol. Vol.10 on page 7 in 1984.
