= Dalbergia capuronii =

Conservation status
- Endangered (IUCN 2.3)

Scientific classification
- Kingdom: Plantae
- Clade: Tracheophytes
- Clade: Angiosperms
- Clade: Eudicots
- Clade: Rosids
- Order: Fabales
- Family: Fabaceae
- Subfamily: Faboideae
- Genus: Dalbergia
- Species: D. capuronii

Binomial name
- Dalbergia capuronii Bosser & Rabevohitra

Species of legume

Dalbergia capuronii is a species of legume in the family Fabaceae.

It is found only in Madagascar. It is threatened by habitat loss.

The Latin specific epithet of capuronii is in honor of the French botanist René Capuron. It was first published in Bull. Mus. Natl. Hist. Nat., B, Adansonia Vol.18 on page 176 in 1996.
