= Podocarpus capuronii =

Conservation status
- Endangered (IUCN 3.1)

Scientific classification
- Kingdom: Plantae
- Clade: Tracheophytes
- Clade: Gymnosperms
- Division: Pinophyta
- Class: Pinopsida
- Order: Araucariales
- Family: Podocarpaceae
- Genus: Podocarpus
- Species: P. capuronii

Binomial name
- Podocarpus capuronii de Laub.

Synonyms
- Podocarpus capuronii var. woltzii (Gaussen) Silba; Podocarpus capuronii subsp. woltzii (Gaussen) Silba; Podocarpus woltzii Gaussen

Species of conifer

Podocarpus capuronii is a species of conifer in the family Podocarpaceae. It is endemic to Madagascar.

== Habitat and range ==
Podocarpus capuronii is native to the highlands of Madagascar, where it ranges from 1,320 to 2,800 meters (4,330 to 9,190 ft) elevation. Herbarium specimens have been collected as high as 2,000 meters (6,600 ft), but it has been observed in subalpine ericoid thickets as high as 2800 meters.

It is found on infertile sandy soils over quartzite or gneiss, on rocky slopes and ridges, and along streams in ravines. This plant slow-growing and stunted in form when growing on open, sandy sites, but in forested areas it can grow to 20 meters tall.

== Taxonomy ==
The Latin specific epithet of capuronii is in honor of the French botanist René Capuron.
