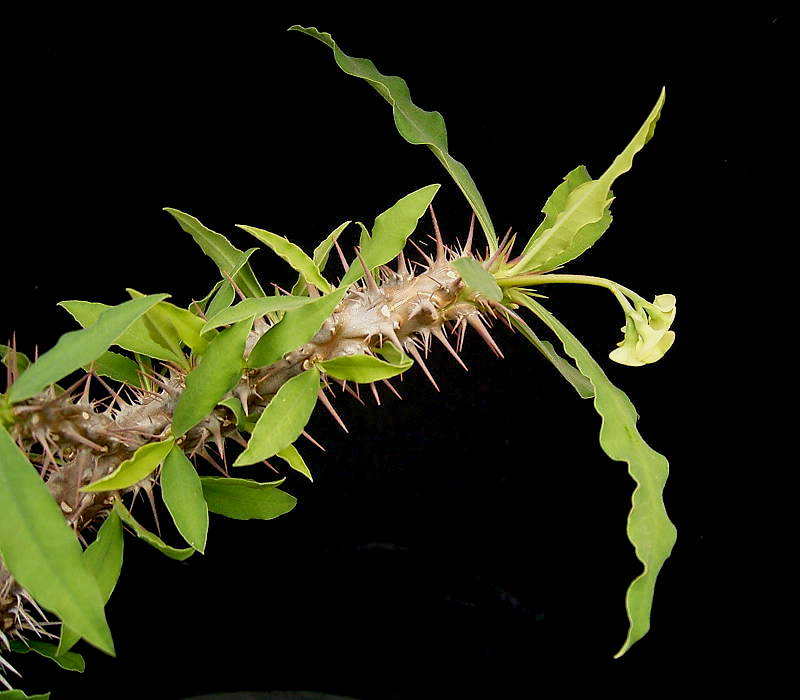

Conservation status
- Critically endangered, possibly extinct in the wild (IUCN 3.1)

Scientific classification
- Kingdom: Plantae
- Clade: Tracheophytes
- Clade: Angiosperms
- Clade: Eudicots
- Clade: Rosids
- Order: Malpighiales
- Family: Euphorbiaceae
- Genus: Euphorbia
- Species: E. capuronii

Binomial name
- Euphorbia capuronii Ursch & Leandri

= Euphorbia capuronii =

Species of flowering plant

Euphorbia capuronii is a species of flowering plant in the family Euphorbiaceae. It is endemic to Madagascar. It is threatened by habitat loss.

The Latin specific epithet of capuronii is in honor of the French botanist René Capuron. It was first published in Mém. Inst. Sci. Madagascar, Sér. B, Biol. Vég. Vol.5 on page 170 (1954, publ. 1955).
