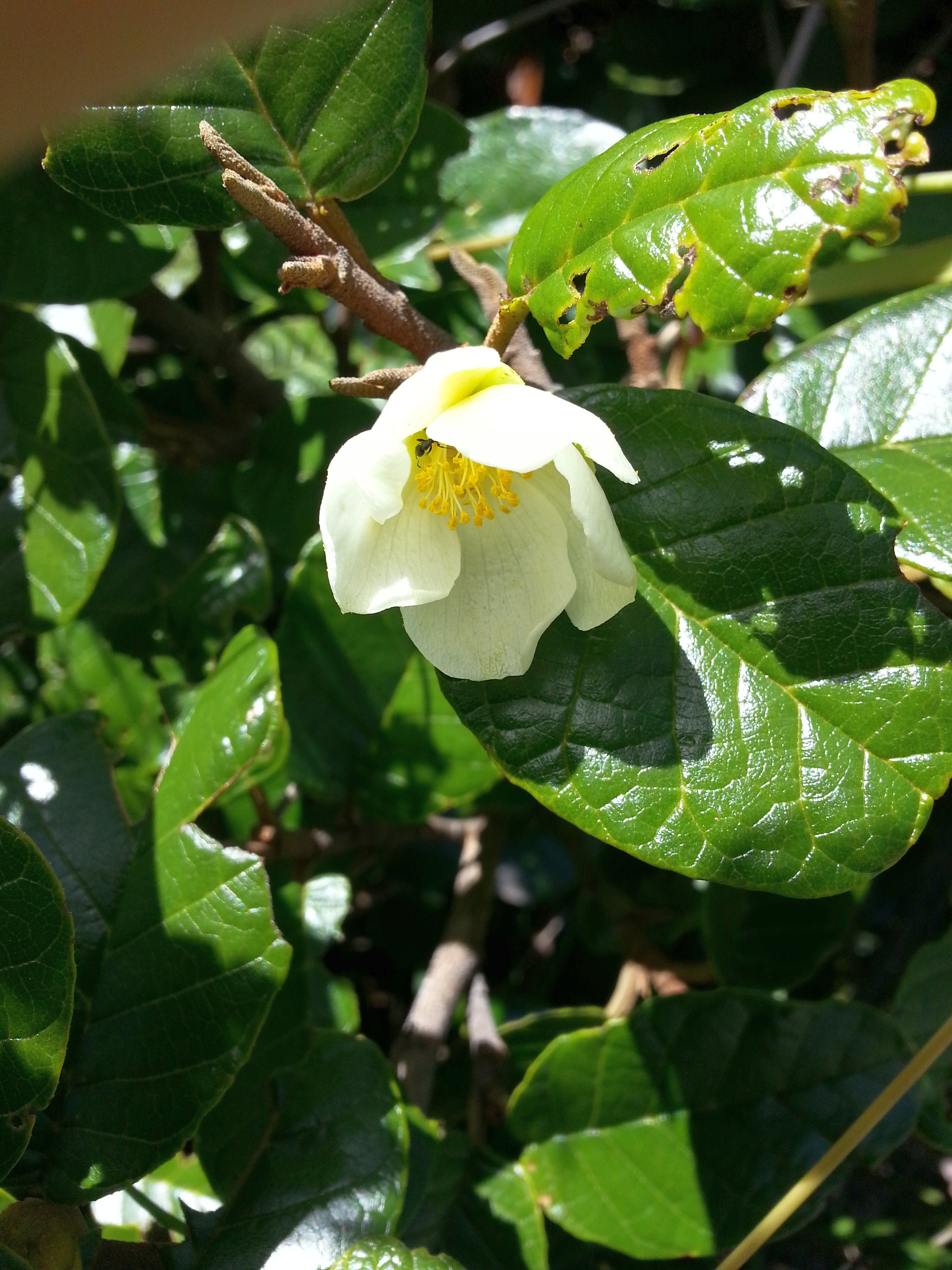
- Pentachlaena latifolia

Scientific classification
- Kingdom: Plantae
- Clade: Tracheophytes
- Clade: Angiosperms
- Clade: Eudicots
- Clade: Rosids
- Order: Malvales
- Family: Sarcolaenaceae
- Genus: Pentachlaena; H.Perrier

Species
- See text

= Pentachlaena =

Genus of flowering plants

Pentachlaena is a genus of flowering plant belonging to the Sarcolaenaceae family, endemic to Madagascar. It was first scientifically described in 1920.

== Species ==
The genus includes the following species:

- Pentachlaena betamponensis Lowry, Haev., Labat & G.E.Schatz 2000
- Pentachlaena latifolia H.Perrier 1920
- Pentachlaena orientalis Capuron 1973
- Pentachlaena vestita Andriamih., Lowry & G.E.Schatz 2016
