= Bulbophyllum minutum =

Scientific classification
- Kingdom: Plantae
- Clade: Tracheophytes
- Clade: Angiosperms
- Clade: Monocots
- Order: Asparagales
- Family: Orchidaceae
- Subfamily: Epidendroideae
- Genus: Bulbophyllum
- Species: B. minutum

Binomial name
- Bulbophyllum minutum Thouars

Synonyms
- Bulbophyllum implexum Jum. & H.Perrier 1912

Species of orchid

Bulbophyllum minutum is a species of orchid in the genus Bulbophyllum found in Madagascar.
