= Bulbophyllum complanatum =

Scientific classification
- Kingdom: Plantae
- Clade: Tracheophytes
- Clade: Angiosperms
- Clade: Monocots
- Order: Asparagales
- Family: Orchidaceae
- Subfamily: Epidendroideae
- Genus: Bulbophyllum
- Species: B. complanatum

Binomial name
- Bulbophyllum complanatum H.Perrier

Synonyms
- Bulbophyllum sigilliforme H.Perrier 1937

Species of orchid

Bulbophyllum complanatum is a species of orchid in the genus Bulbophyllum found in Madagascar.
