= Bulbophyllum capuronii =

Scientific classification
- Kingdom: Plantae
- Clade: Tracheophytes
- Clade: Angiosperms
- Clade: Monocots
- Order: Asparagales
- Family: Orchidaceae
- Subfamily: Epidendroideae
- Genus: Bulbophyllum
- Species: B. capuronii

Binomial name
- Bulbophyllum capuronii Bosser

Species of orchid

Bulbophyllum capuronii is a species of orchid in the genus Bulbophyllum.

The Latin specific epithet of capuronii is in honor of the French botanist René Capuron.

It is native to Madagascar.

It was first published in Adansonia, n.s., Vol.11 on page 333 in 1971.

== Other sources ==
- The Bulbophyllum-Checklist
- The Internet Orchid Species Photo Encyclopedia
