= Bulbophyllum macrocarpum =

Scientific classification
- Kingdom: Plantae
- Clade: Tracheophytes
- Clade: Angiosperms
- Clade: Monocots
- Order: Asparagales
- Family: Orchidaceae
- Subfamily: Epidendroideae
- Genus: Bulbophyllum
- Species: B. macrocarpum

Binomial name
- Bulbophyllum macrocarpum Frapp. ex Cordem.

Species of orchid

Bulbophyllum macrocarpum is a species of orchid in the genus Bulbophyllum.
