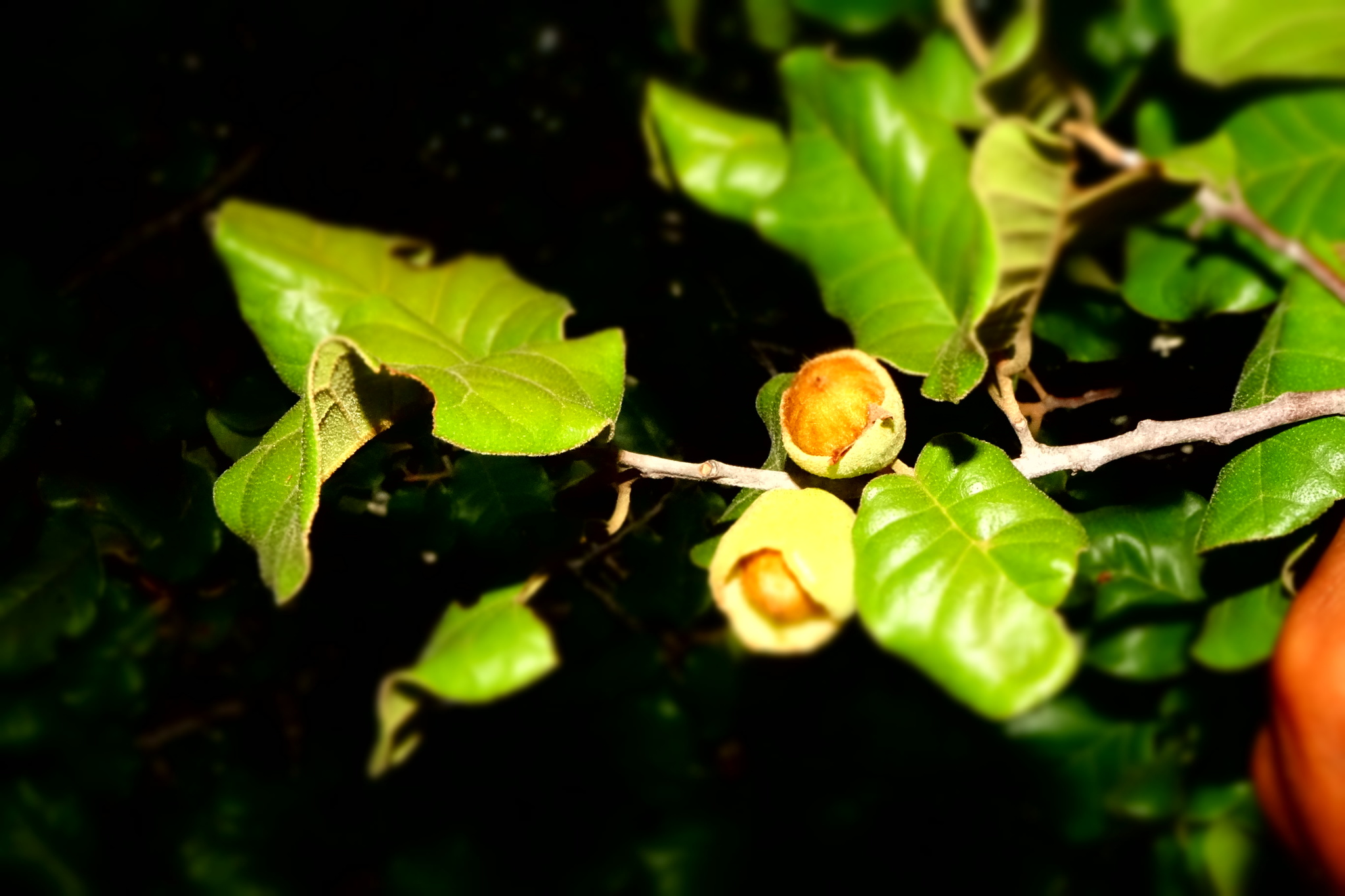
- Perrierodendron boinense

Scientific classification
- Kingdom: Plantae
- Clade: Tracheophytes
- Clade: Angiosperms
- Clade: Eudicots
- Clade: Rosids
- Order: Malvales
- Family: Sarcolaenaceae
- Genus: Perrierodendron; Cavaco

Species
- See text

= Perrierodendron =

Genus of flowering plants

Perrierodendron is a genus of trees and shrubs in the family Sarcolaenaceae. They are endemic to Madagascar.

The genus name of Perrierodendron is in honour of Joseph Marie Henry Alfred Perrier de la Bâthie (1873–1958), a French botanist who specialized in the plants of Madagascar. It was first described and published in Bull. Mus. Natl. Hist. Nat., séries 2, Vol.23 on page 138 in 1951.

== Species ==
The genus includes the following species:

- Perrierodendron boinense (H. Perrier) Cavaco
- Perrierodendron capuronii J.-F. Leroy, Lowry, Haev., Labat & G.E.Schatz
- Perrierodendron occidentale J.-F. Leroy, Lowry, Haev., Labat & G.E.Schatz
- Perrierodendron quartzitorum J.-F. Leroy, Lowry, Haev., Labat & G.E.Schatz
- Perrierodendron rodoense J.-F. Leroy, Lowry, Haev., Labat & G.E.Schatz
