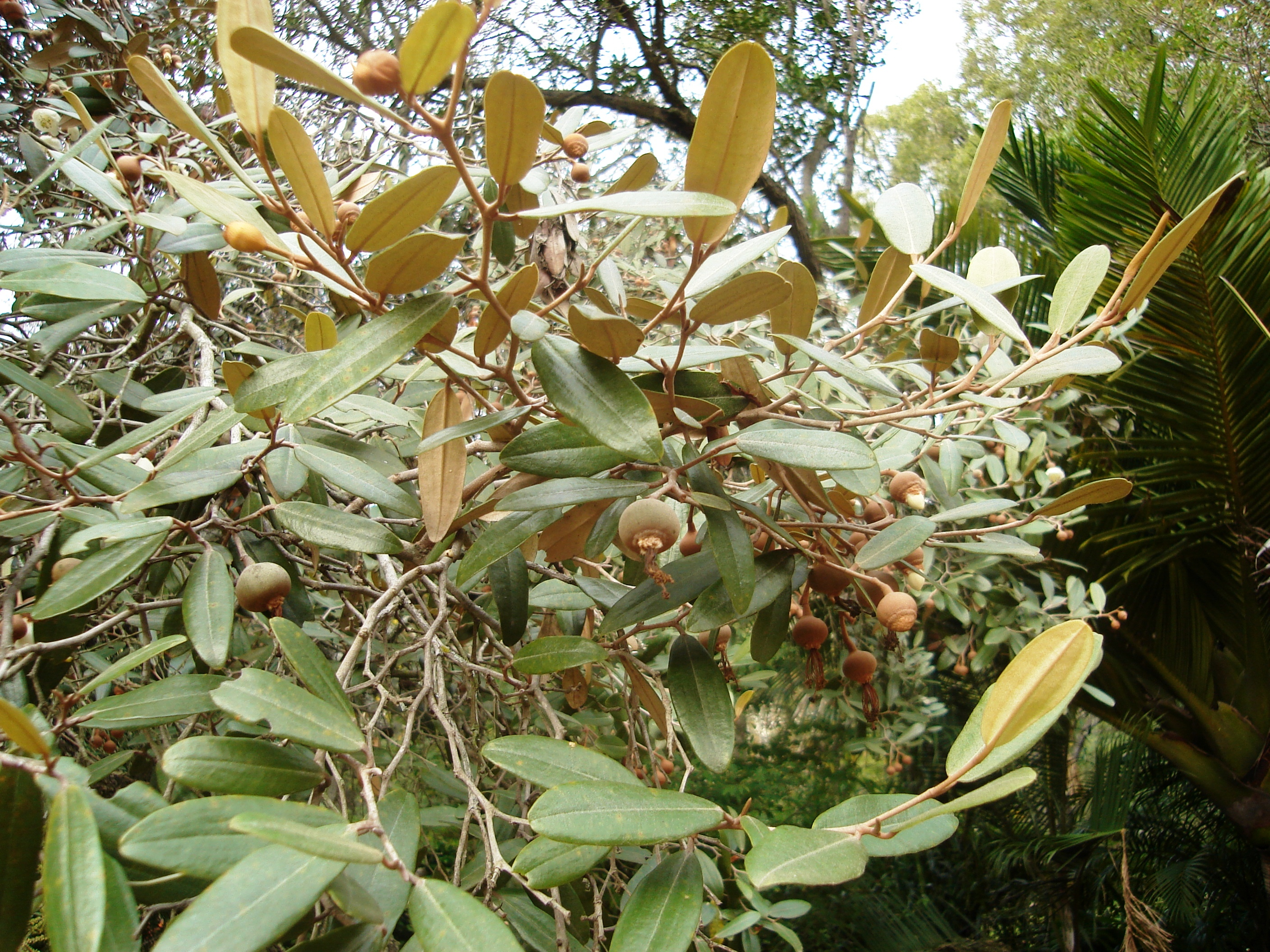
- Sarcolaena oblongifolia

Scientific classification
- Kingdom: Plantae
- Clade: Tracheophytes
- Clade: Angiosperms
- Clade: Eudicots
- Clade: Rosids
- Order: Malvales
- Family: Sarcolaenaceae
- Genus: Sarcolaena; Thouars (1805)

Species
- See text

= Sarcolaena =

Genus of flowering plants

Sarcolaena is a genus of flowering plants in the family Sarcolaenaceae. This family is endemic to Madagascar. There are about 8 species in the genus.

Species include:

- Sarcolaena codonochlamys Baker
- Sarcolaena delphinensis Cavaco
- Sarcolaena eriophora Thouars
- Sarcolaena grandiflora Thouars
- Sarcolaena humbertiana Cavaco
- Sarcolaena isaloensis Randrianasolo & Miller
- Sarcolaena multiflora Thouars
- Sarcolaena oblongifolia F.Gérard
