= René Paul Raymond Capuron =

French botanist (1921–1971)

René Paul Raymond Capuron (20 October 1921 – 24 August 1971) was a French botanist. He was responsible for an extensive amount of work on the tree flora of Madagascar. Several plants with the species epithet of capuronii honor his name, examples being Podocarpus capuronii and Schizolaena capuronii. The standard author abbreviation Capuron is used to indicate this person as the author when citing a botanical name.

== Works ==
Highlights of his work include:

- M. arillata — a new species of Mauloutchia, formed from the collection of Myristicaceae specimens.
- Takhtajania perrieri — the only extant representative of the family Winteraceae. Capuron was the first to rediscover the plant, following its last sighting by Henri Perrier de la Bathie, back in 1909.

== Bibliography ==
- Essai d'introduction à l'étude de la flore forestière de Madagascar, Tananarive, Inspection Générale des Eaux & Forêts, 1957, 125 pp.
- Rhopalocarpacées. In: Flore de Madagascar et des Comores, vol. 127, Paris, 1963, 41 pp.
- Révision des Sapindacées de Madagascar et des Comores. In: Mémoires du Muséum national d'Histoire naturelle, t. 19, Paris, 1969, 189 pp.

== Legacy ==
Capuron is commemorated in the scientific name of a species of chameleon, Calumma capuroni, which is endemic to Madagascar. He is also honored in the names of several species of plant, also endemic to Madagascar. Such as Aponogeton capuronii, Bulbophyllum capuronii, Dalbergia capuronii, Euphorbia capuronii, Millettia capuronii, Perrierodendron capuronii, Podocarpus capuronii, Schizolaena capuronii, Staufferia capuronii, Stephanostegia capuronii and Tabernaemontana capuronii.
