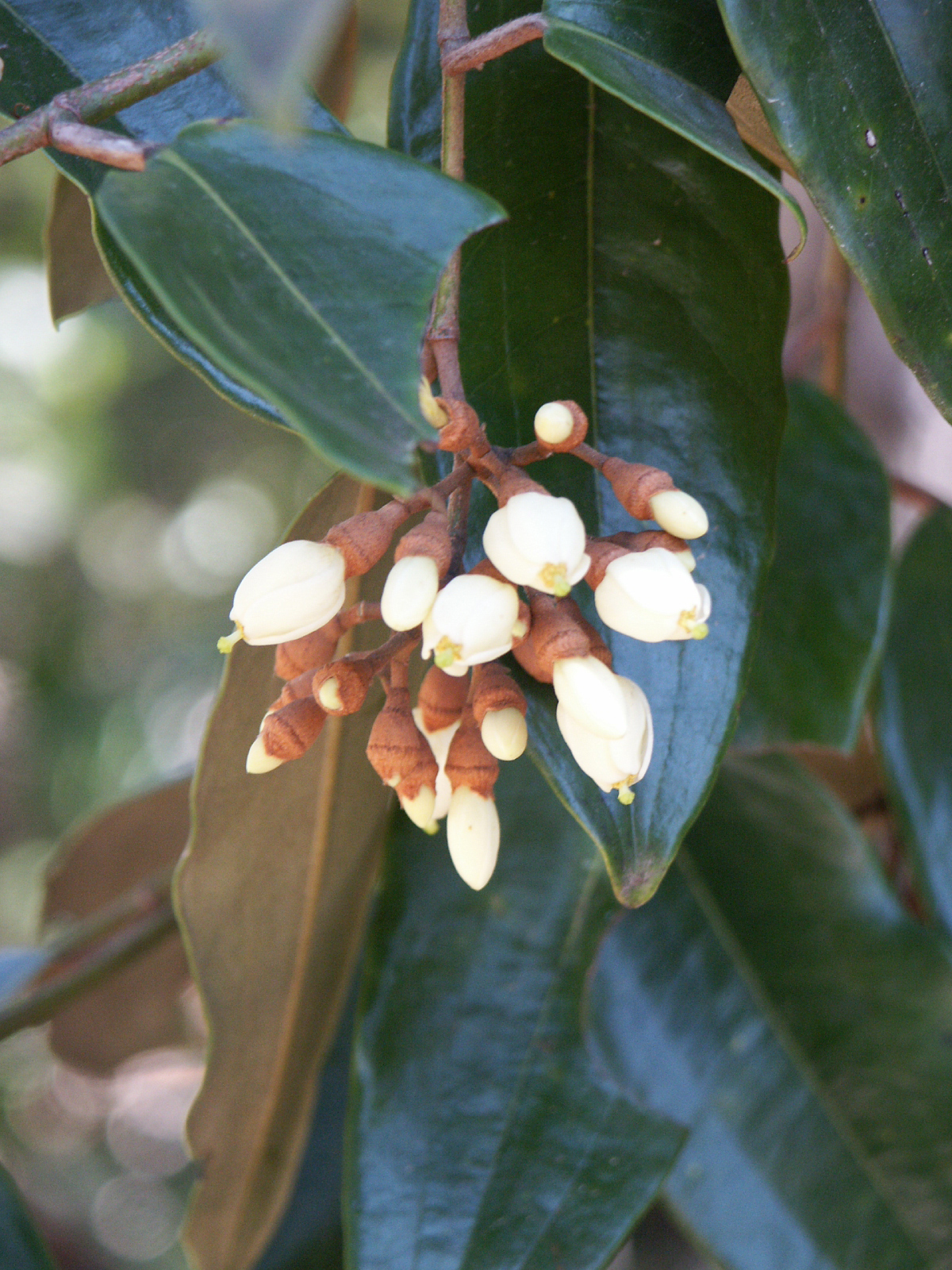
- Leptolaena multiflora

Scientific classification
- Kingdom: Plantae
- Clade: Tracheophytes
- Clade: Angiosperms
- Clade: Eudicots
- Clade: Rosids
- Order: Malvales
- Family: Sarcolaenaceae; Caruel (1881) nom. cons.

Genera
- Eremolaena Baill.; Leptolaena Thouars; Mediusella (Cavaco) Hutch.; Pentachlaena H.Perrier; Perrierodendron Cavaco; Rhodolaena Thouars; Sarcolaena Thouars; Schizolaena Thouars; Xerochlamys Baker; Xyloolaena Baill.

= Sarcolaenaceae =

Family of flowering plants

The Sarcolaenaceae are a family of flowering plants endemic to Madagascar. The family includes 79 species of mostly evergreen trees and shrubs in ten genera.

Recent DNA studies indicate that the Sarcolaenaceae are a sibling taxon to the family Dipterocarpaceae of Africa, South America, India, Southeast Asia and Malesia.
