= Ephippiandra tsaratanensis =

Conservation status
- Critically Endangered (IUCN 3.1)

Scientific classification
- Kingdom: Plantae
- Clade: Embryophytes
- Clade: Tracheophytes
- Clade: Spermatophytes
- Clade: Angiosperms
- Clade: Magnoliids
- Order: Laurales
- Family: Monimiaceae
- Genus: Ephippiandra
- Species: E. tsaratanensis

Binomial name
- Ephippiandra tsaratanensis (Cavaco) Lorence

Synonyms
- Hedycaryopsis tsaratanensis Cavaco

Species of flowering plant

Ephippiandra tsaratanensis is a species of flowering plant endemic to the Tsaratanana Massif of northern Madagascar.

== Description ==
Ephippiandra tsaratanensis is tree which grows up to 25 meters tall.

== Range and habitat ==
Ephippiandra tsaratanensis is endemic to the Tsaratanana Massif of northern Madagascar. Only two subpopulations are known, with an estimated area of occupancy (AOO) of 8 km^{2}. It is native to high-elevation humid sclerophyllous montane forest and ericoid thicket between 1,800 and 2,500 meters elevation.

== Conservation and threats ==
The species' conservation status is assessed as critically endangered. Although both subpopulations are in Tsaratanana Strict Nature Reserve, it is threatened by habitat loss from illegal logging and agricultural activities.
