= Ephippiandra perrieri =

Conservation status
- Least Concern (IUCN 3.1)

Scientific classification
- Kingdom: Plantae
- Clade: Embryophytes
- Clade: Tracheophytes
- Clade: Spermatophytes
- Clade: Angiosperms
- Clade: Magnoliids
- Order: Laurales
- Family: Monimiaceae
- Genus: Ephippiandra
- Species: E. perrieri

Binomial name
- Ephippiandra perrieri (Cavaco) Lorence

Synonyms
- Hedycaryopsis perrieri Cavaco

Species of flowering plant

Ephippiandra perrieri is a species of flowering plant endemic to the Northern Highlands of Madagascar.

== Description ==
Ephippiandra perrieri grows as a shrub to a medium-sized tree, up to 15 meters tall.

== Range and habitat ==
The tree is native to the Northern Highlands of Madasgascar, including the Marojejy and Tsaratanana Massifs. There are seven known subpopulations, including on Ambohimirahavavy Mountain.

It grows in humid sclerophyllous montane cloud forests and in high-elevation ericoid thickets, typically on lateritic soils, from 1,500 to 2,500 meters elevation.

== Conservation and threats ==
The species' conservation status is assessed as Least Concern. All of the known subpopulations are in protected areas, including Marojejy National Park, Tsaratanana Strict Nature Reserve, and COMATSA Nord (Marojejy-Anjanaharibe Sud-Tsaratanana forest corridor), and live in large blocks of relatively intact forest.
