= Phyllonorycter brachylaenae =

Scientific classification
- Kingdom: Animalia
- Phylum: Arthropoda
- Class: Insecta
- Order: Lepidoptera
- Family: Gracillariidae
- Genus: Phyllonorycter
- Species: P. brachylaenae

Binomial name
- Phyllonorycter brachylaenae (Vári, 1961)

Synonyms
- Lithocolletis brachylaenae Vári, 1961

Species of moth

Phyllonorycter brachylaenae is a moth of the family Gracillariidae. It is known from South Africa. The habitat consists of understory vegetation in secondary forests.

The length of the forewings is 3.06–3.33 mm. Adults are on wing from early March to mid-May and from late June to late October.

The larvae feed on Brachylaena discolor and Brachylaena rotundata. They mine the leaves of their host plant.
