= Ephippiandra madagascariensis =

Conservation status
- Least Concern (IUCN 3.1)

Scientific classification
- Kingdom: Plantae
- Clade: Embryophytes
- Clade: Tracheophytes
- Clade: Spermatophytes
- Clade: Angiosperms
- Clade: Magnoliids
- Order: Laurales
- Family: Monimiaceae
- Genus: Ephippiandra
- Species: E. madagascariensis

Binomial name
- Ephippiandra madagascariensis (Danguy) Lorence

Synonyms
- Hedycaryopsis madagascariensis Danguy

Species of flowering plant

Ephippiandra madagascariensis is a species of flowering plant endemic to Madagascar, where it is known as ambora.

== Range and habitat ==
Ephippiandra madagascariensis is native to northern and eastern Madagascar. It grows in humid and subhumid lowland and montane forests, from sea level to 1,800 meters elevation. It is typically found on lateritic soils.

There are 27 known subpopulations.

== Conservation and threats ==
The species' forest habitat is under threat from shifting agriculture, firewood collection, charcoal production, fire, logging, and timber harvesting.

The species is found in many protected areas, including Ambositra Vondrozo Forest Corridor, Analamazaotra, Andohahela, Anjanaharibe Sud, Anjozorobe Angavo, Ankeniheny-Zahamena Corridor, Kalambatritra, Loky-Manambato, Makira, Manongarivo, Marojejy, Montagne d'Ambre (including Amber Forest Reserve), Nosy Mangabe, Ranomafana, and Zahamena.

== Uses ==
Its timber is used for fine carpentry.
