= Leptolaena cuspidata =

Conservation status
- Least Concern (IUCN 3.1)

Scientific classification
- Kingdom: Plantae
- Clade: Tracheophytes
- Clade: Angiosperms
- Clade: Eudicots
- Clade: Rosids
- Order: Malvales
- Family: Sarcolaenaceae
- Genus: Leptolaena
- Species: L. cuspidata

Binomial name
- Leptolaena cuspidata Baker

Species of flowering plant

Leptolaena cuspidata is a species of flowering plant in the Sarcolaenaceae family. It is found only in Madagascar. Its natural habitats are subtropical or tropical dry forests and subtropical or tropical moist lowland forests. It is threatened by habitat loss.

== Description ==
Leptolaena cuspidata is a shrub to a small tree. It flowers from January to November.

== Range and habitat ==
Leptolaena cuspidata is endemic to northwestern Madagascar. It inhabits dry deciduous forests of central Diana Region, and the subhumid forests of the Sambirano region in southern Diana Region and northernmost Sofia Region. It grows from 10 to 500 meters elevation on a variety of substrates, including sandstone, lava, basement rock, Mesozoic limestone, unconsolidated sands, and alluvial and lake deposits. The species is known from 129 records at 21 locations. Based on the known locations, the species' estimated extent of occurrence (EOO) is 24,265 km^{2}, and an estimated area of occupancy (AOO) of 252 km^{2}. These estimates may be low because of under-sampling.

== Conservation and threats ==
The species has a declining population, and is threatened by habitat loss across much of its range. Threats include deforestation from shifting cultivation and logging, over-harvesting timber, and the declining population of animals, including birds and lemurs, which disperse its seeds.
