= Leptolaena abrahamii =

Conservation status
- Near Threatened (IUCN 3.1)

Scientific classification
- Kingdom: Plantae
- Clade: Tracheophytes
- Clade: Angiosperms
- Clade: Eudicots
- Clade: Rosids
- Order: Malvales
- Family: Sarcolaenaceae
- Genus: Leptolaena
- Species: L. abrahamii

Binomial name
- Leptolaena abrahamii G.E.Schatz & Lowry

Species of flowering plant

Leptolaena abrahamii is a species of flowering plant in the family Sarcolaenaceae. It is found only in Madagascar. Its natural habitat is mid-elevation humid tropical forests. It is threatened by habitat loss.

== Description ==
Leptolaena abrahamii is a shrub to medium-sized tree. It flowers and fruits from October to June.

== Range and habitat ==
Leptolaena abrahamii is native to the eastern slope of Madagascar's Central Highlands. There are 17 known subpopulations. It occurs in Analamazaotra National Park, Ambatovy, and around Moramanga north-northeast to Zahamena National Park, and further south in Ampasinambo and Ranomafana National Park. The species' estimated extent of occurrence (EOO) is 9,891.1 km^{2}, and its estimated area of occupancy (AOO) is 104 km^{2}.

The species grows in mid-elevation humid montane evergreen forest between 729 and 1,097 meters elevation. It sometimes found in degraded remant vegetation, and grows on crust or lateritic soils.

== Conservation and threats ==
The species is threatened by habitat loss from human activity, including deforestation for shifting cultivation and mining and by human-caused fires. It is intolerant of forest disturbance. It is also threatened by logging for timber, and reduced populations of seed-dispersing animals like birds and lemurs.

Eight subpopulations are within protected areas, including Analamazaotra National Park, Ankeniheny-Zahamena Corridor (Main parcel and Vohibe Forest), Ranomafana National Park, Torotorofotsy Ramsar Site, and Zahamena National Park.

== Uses ==
The tree's timber is used for posts, house frames, planks, lumber, and fuel wood. Parts of the tree are used for traditional medicine. The bark is used to make a local alcoholic beverage.
