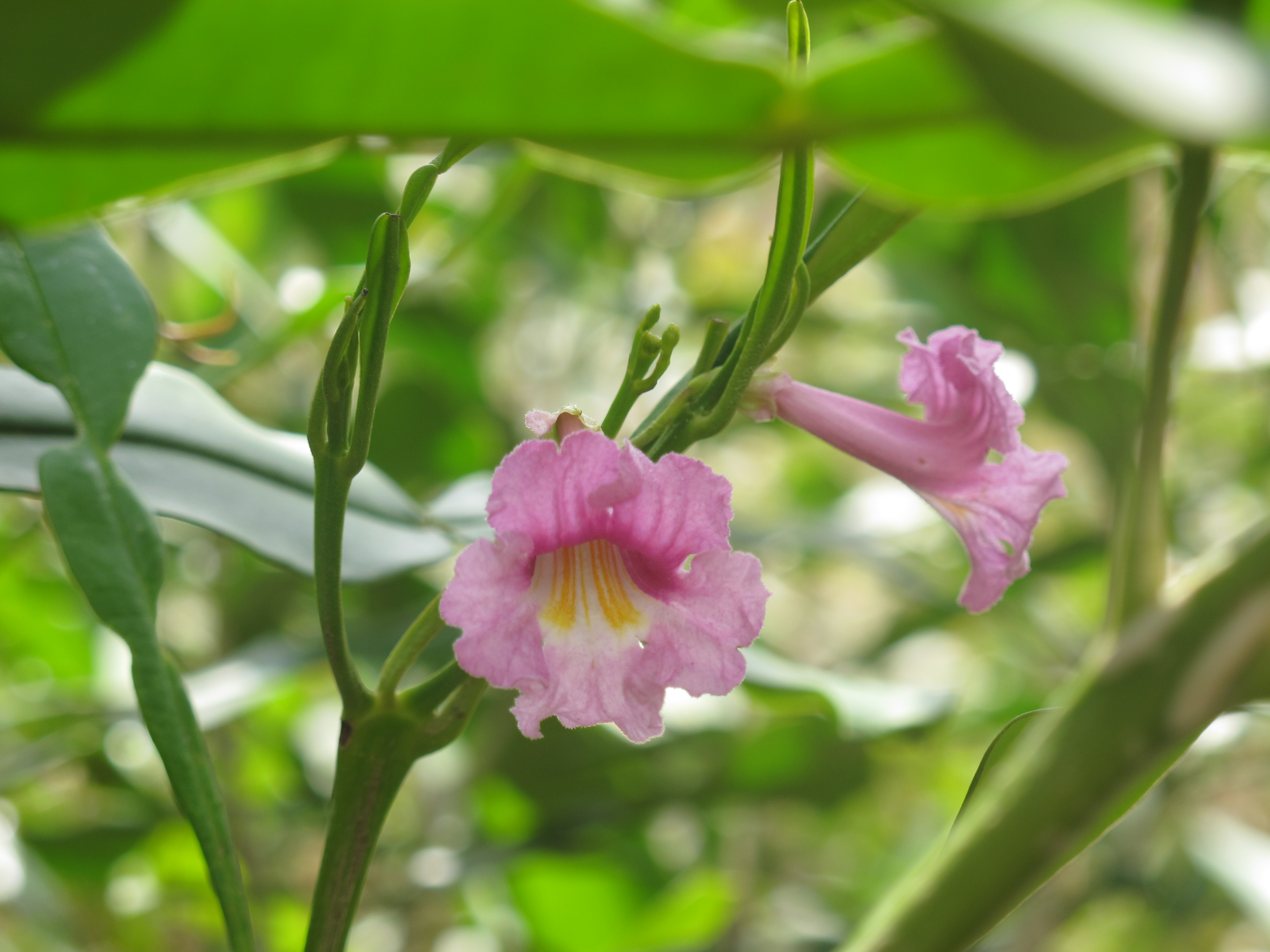

Conservation status
- Least Concern (IUCN 3.1)

Scientific classification
- Kingdom: Plantae
- Clade: Tracheophytes
- Clade: Angiosperms
- Clade: Eudicots
- Clade: Asterids
- Order: Lamiales
- Family: Bignoniaceae
- Genus: Phyllarthron
- Species: P. bojerianum

Binomial name
- Phyllarthron bojerianum DC.

Synonyms
- Arthrophyllum bojerianum DC., pro syn.; Arthrophyllum madagascariense Bojer, nom. nud.; Phyllarthron bojerianum var. elongatum DC.; Phyllarthron madagascariensis K.Schum.

= Phyllarthron bojerianum =

Species of flowering plant

Phyllarthron bojerianum is a species of flowering plant in the family Bignoniaceae. It is a shrub or tree endemic to Madagascar that grows 10 to 15 meters tall. It is widespread on the island, where it grows in humid lowland and littoral forests, dry deciduous forests, and lowland and montane subhumid forests from 5 to 2180 meters elevation.

The species was first described by Augustin Pyramus de Candolle in 1845.
