= Euphorbia tetraptera =

Conservation status
- Least Concern (IUCN 3.1)

Scientific classification
- Kingdom: Plantae
- Clade: Tracheophytes
- Clade: Angiosperms
- Clade: Eudicots
- Clade: Rosids
- Order: Malpighiales
- Family: Euphorbiaceae
- Genus: Euphorbia
- Species: E. tetraptera

Binomial name
- Euphorbia tetraptera Baker

Synonyms
- Euphorbia bakeriana Baill.; Euphorbia eumyrmodes Baker ex Denis; Euphorbia tetraptera var. robusta Leandri

Species of plant

Euphorbia tetraptera is a species of plant in the family Euphorbiaceae. It is endemic to Madagascar. Its natural habitats are tropical moist lowland forest and tropical moist montane forest. It is threatened by habitat loss.
