= Leptolaena gautieri =

Conservation status
- Least Concern (IUCN 3.1)

Scientific classification
- Kingdom: Plantae
- Clade: Tracheophytes
- Clade: Angiosperms
- Clade: Eudicots
- Clade: Rosids
- Order: Malvales
- Family: Sarcolaenaceae
- Genus: Leptolaena
- Species: L. gautieri

Binomial name
- Leptolaena gautieri G.E.Schatz & Lowry

Species of flowering plant

Leptolaena gautieri is a species of flowering plant in the Sarcolaenaceae family. It is found only in Madagascar.

== Description ==
Leptolaena gautieri is a small to medium-sized evergreen tree, growing from 3 to 5 meters tall. It flowers in July and August.

== Range and habitat ==
Leptolaena gautieri is native to eastern Madagascar and to the Sambirano region of northwestern Madagascar.

Its natural habitat is mid-elevation moist lowland forest and montane subhumid forest from 300 to 1,480 meters elevation.

It is threatened by habitat loss.
