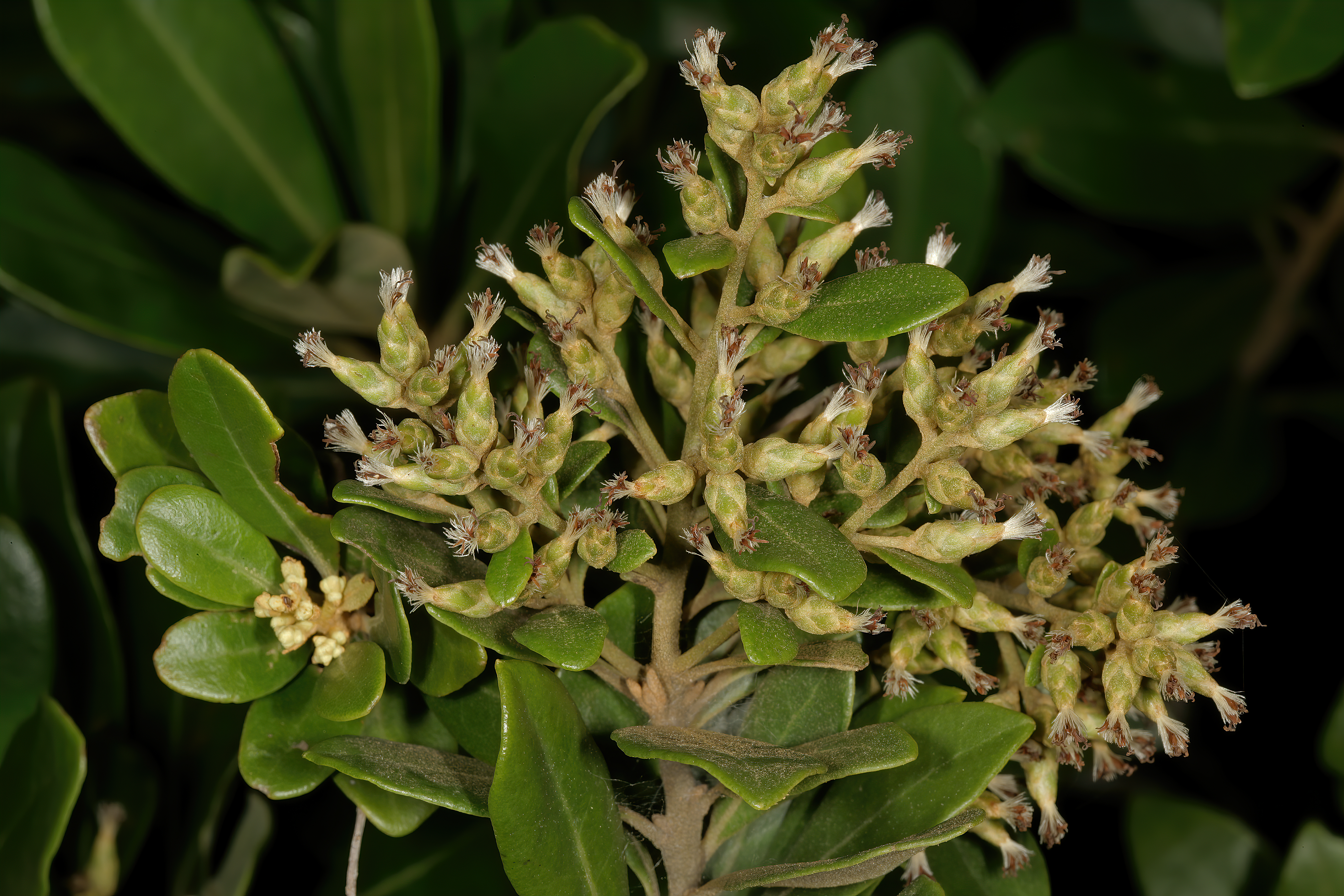

Conservation status
- Least Concern (IUCN 2.3)

Scientific classification
- Kingdom: Plantae
- Clade: Tracheophytes
- Clade: Angiosperms
- Clade: Eudicots
- Clade: Asterids
- Order: Asterales
- Family: Asteraceae
- Genus: Brachylaena
- Species: B. glabra

Binomial name
- Brachylaena glabra (L.f.) Druce

Synonyms
- Brachylaena dentata DC.; Brachylaena grandifolia DC.; Tarchonanthus dentatus Thunb.; Tarchonanthus glaber L.f.

= Brachylaena glabra =

Species of flowering plant

Brachylaena glabra, the Malabar silver-oak, is a tree that is endemic to South Africa and occurs in KwaZulu-Natal and the Eastern Cape.
