= Leptolaena raymondii =

Conservation status
- Endangered (IUCN 3.1)

Scientific classification
- Kingdom: Plantae
- Clade: Tracheophytes
- Clade: Angiosperms
- Clade: Eudicots
- Clade: Rosids
- Order: Malvales
- Family: Sarcolaenaceae
- Genus: Leptolaena
- Species: L. raymondii

Binomial name
- Leptolaena raymondii G.E.Schatz & Lowry

Species of flowering plant

Leptolaena raymondii is a species of flowering plant in the Sarcolaenaceae family. It is found only in Madagascar. Its natural habitat is sandy shores. It is threatened by habitat loss.
