= Brachylaena perrieri =

Conservation status
- Least Concern (IUCN 2.3)

Scientific classification
- Kingdom: Plantae
- Clade: Tracheophytes
- Clade: Angiosperms
- Clade: Eudicots
- Clade: Asterids
- Order: Asterales
- Family: Asteraceae
- Genus: Brachylaena
- Species: B. perrieri

Binomial name
- Brachylaena perrieri Humbert

Species of flowering plant

Brachylaena perrieri is a tree belonging to the Asteraceae family and is endemic to Madagascar.
