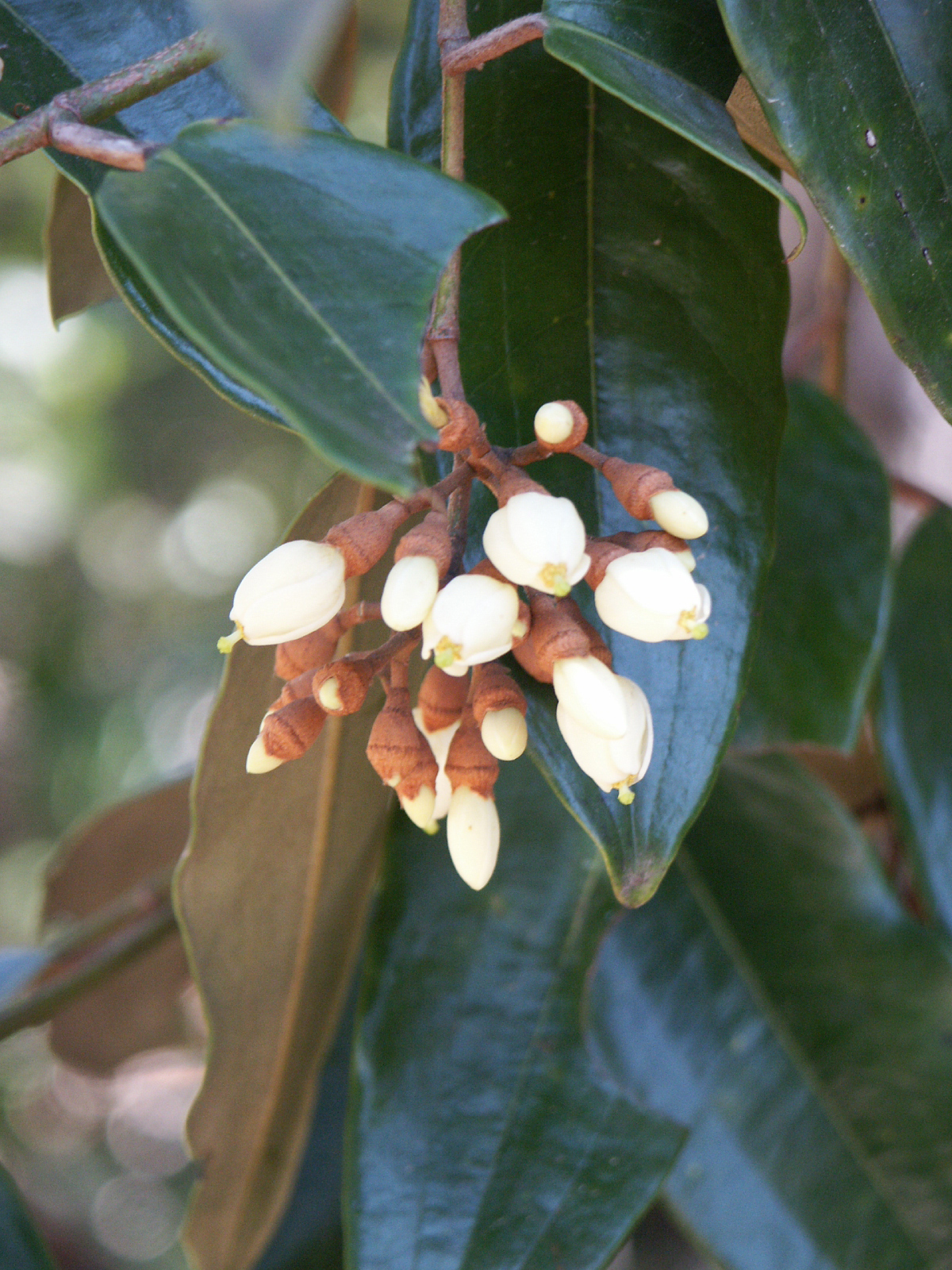
- Leptolaena multiflora

Scientific classification
- Kingdom: Plantae
- Clade: Tracheophytes
- Clade: Angiosperms
- Clade: Eudicots
- Clade: Rosids
- Order: Malvales
- Family: Sarcolaenaceae
- Genus: Leptolaena; Thouars (1805)

Synonyms
- Leptochlaena Spreng. (1830), orth. var.

= Leptolaena =

Genus of flowering plants

Leptolaena is a genus of flowering plants in the family Sarcolaenaceae. There are 9 species, all native to Madagascar.

== Species ==
Nine species are accepted.

- Leptolaena abrahamii G.E.Schatz & Lowry
- Leptolaena arenaria (F.Gérard) Cavaco
- Leptolaena cuspidata Baker
- Leptolaena delphinensis G.E.Schatz & Lowry
- Leptolaena gautieri G.E.Schatz & Lowry
- Leptolaena masoalensis G.E.Schatz & Lowry
- Leptolaena multiflora Thouars
- Leptolaena pauciflora Baker
- Leptolaena raymondii G.E.Schatz & Lowry
