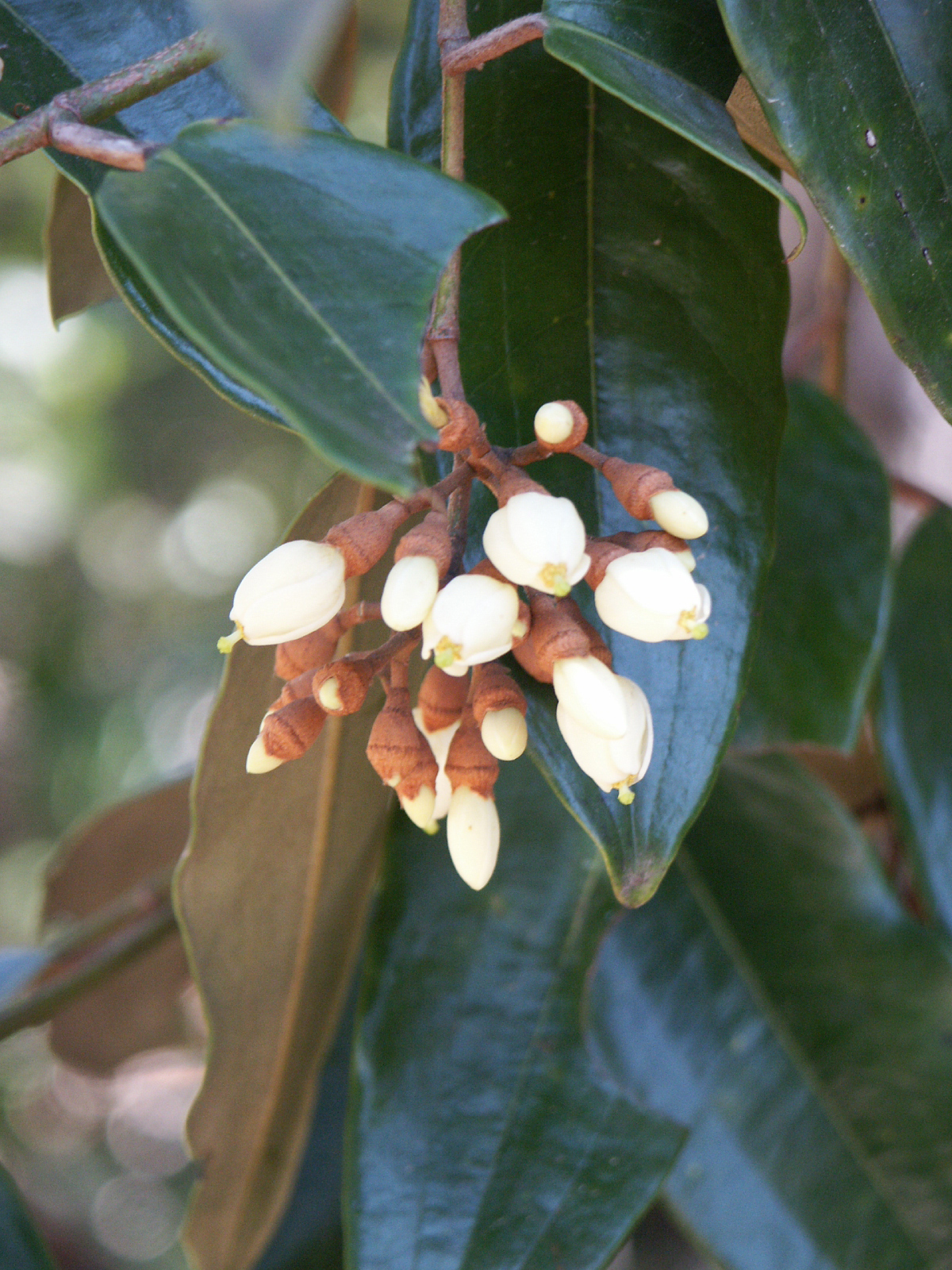

Conservation status
- Least Concern (IUCN 3.1)

Scientific classification
- Kingdom: Plantae
- Clade: Tracheophytes
- Clade: Angiosperms
- Clade: Eudicots
- Clade: Rosids
- Order: Malvales
- Family: Sarcolaenaceae
- Genus: Leptolaena
- Species: L. multiflora

Binomial name
- Leptolaena multiflora Thouars

= Leptolaena multiflora =

Species of flowering plant

Leptolaena multiflora is a species of flowering plant in the family Sarcolaenaceae. It is found only in Madagascar. Its natural habitats are subtropical or tropical moist lowland forests and sandy shores. It is threatened by habitat loss.
