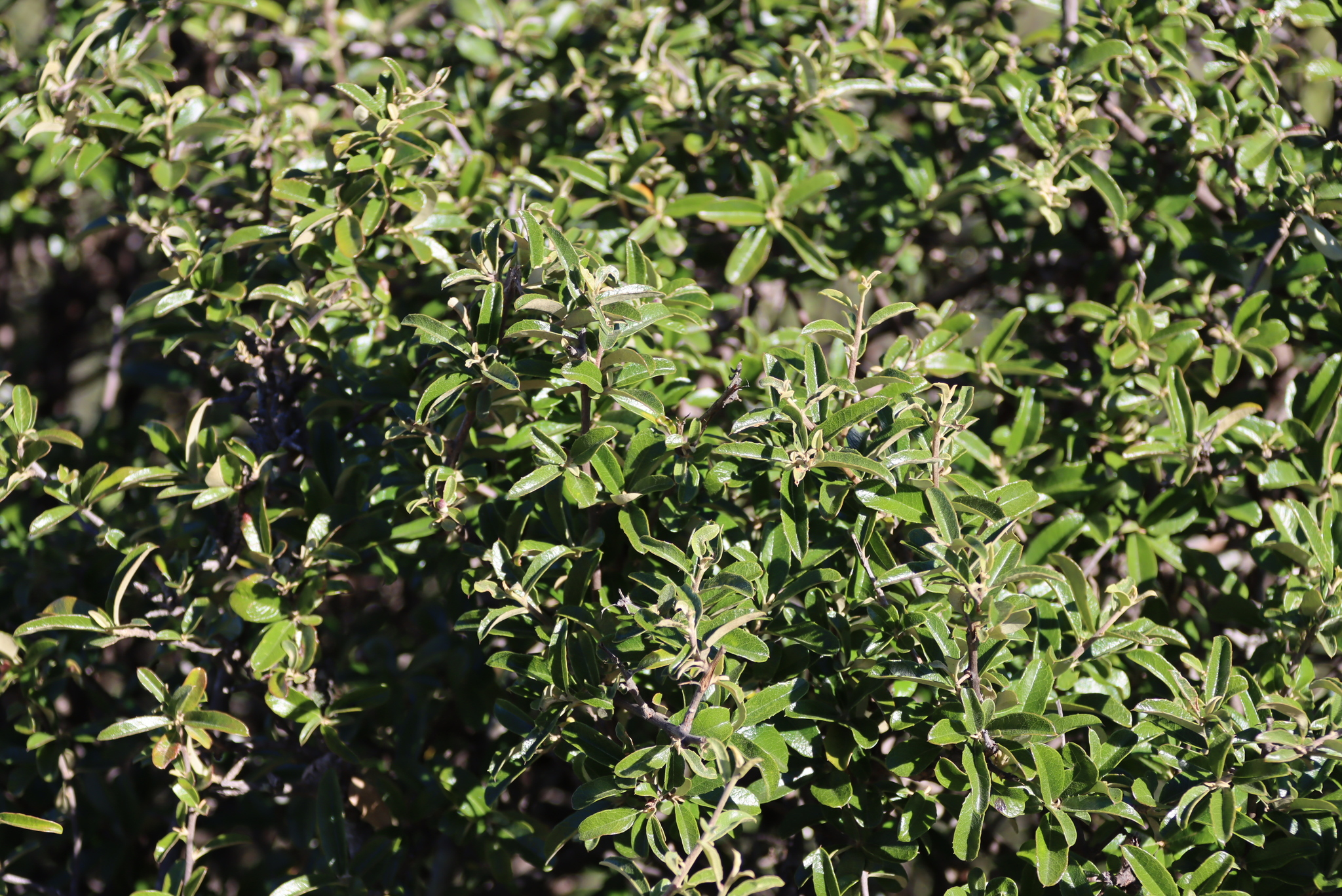

Conservation status
- Least Concern (IUCN 2.3)

Scientific classification
- Kingdom: Plantae
- Clade: Embryophytes
- Clade: Tracheophytes
- Clade: Spermatophytes
- Clade: Angiosperms
- Clade: Eudicots
- Clade: Asterids
- Order: Asterales
- Family: Asteraceae
- Genus: Brachylaena
- Species: B. ilicifolia

Binomial name
- Brachylaena ilicifolia (Lam.) Phillips & Schweick.

Synonyms
- Baccharis ilicifolia Lam.; Brachylaena racemosa Less.; Tarchonanthus racemosus Thunb.

= Brachylaena ilicifolia =

Species of flowering plant

Brachylaena ilicifolia, the small-leaved silver-oak, is a shrub to small tree native to Botswana, Eswatini and South Africa. It occurs on rocky places or on slopes in bushveld.
