= Leptolaena arenaria =

Conservation status
- Near Threatened (IUCN 3.1)

Scientific classification
- Kingdom: Plantae
- Clade: Tracheophytes
- Clade: Angiosperms
- Clade: Eudicots
- Clade: Rosids
- Order: Malvales
- Family: Sarcolaenaceae
- Genus: Leptolaena
- Species: L. arenaria

Binomial name
- Leptolaena arenaria (F.Gérard) Cavaco

Synonyms
- Mediusella arenaria (F.Gérard) Hong-Wa; Xerochlamys acuminata F.Gérard; Xerochlamys arenaria F.Gérard

Species of flowering plant

Leptolaena arenaria is a tree in the family Sarcolaenaceae. It is endemic to Madagascar.

== Description ==
Leptolaena arenaria grows up to 12 m (40 ft) tall with a trunk diameter of up to 30 cm (12 in). Its bright green leaves are ovate in shape and measure up to 7 cm (3 in) long. The tree's flowers typically occur in inflorescences of two flowers, each with white petals. The roundish fruits measure up to 1.2 cm (0.5 in) in diameter. The species is used in local medicine.

== Distribution and habitat ==
Leptolaena arenaria is known only from the northwestern regions of Diana, Betsiboka, Boeny, Melaky and Sofia. Its habitat is in dry forests from sea level to 408 m (1,339 ft) elevation.

== Conservation ==
Leptolaena arenaria has been assessed as near threatened on the IUCN Red List. Its habitat is threatened by wildfires, conversion of land for agriculture and harvesting for wood. The species is present in some protected areas including Ankarafantsika National Park.
