= Ephippiandra masoalensis =

Conservation status
- Least Concern (IUCN 3.1)

Scientific classification
- Kingdom: Plantae
- Clade: Embryophytes
- Clade: Tracheophytes
- Clade: Spermatophytes
- Clade: Angiosperms
- Clade: Magnoliids
- Order: Laurales
- Family: Monimiaceae
- Genus: Ephippiandra
- Species: E. masoalensis

Binomial name
- Ephippiandra masoalensis Lorence

Species of flowering plant

Ephippiandra masoalensis is a species of flowering plant endemic to the Masoala Peninsula of eastern Madagascar.

== Description ==
Ephippiandra masoalensis is small tree, growing up to five meters tall.

== Range and habitat ==
The species is known from a single population in Masoala National Park on the Masoala Peninsula of eastern Madgagascar, overhanging the Antalavia River at 380 meters elevation. It grows in humid tropical evergreen lowland forest on lateritic soil.

== Conservation and threats ==
The species sole known population is in Masoala National Park, which is considered to be well-protected. The larger Madagascar lowland forests ecoregion is threatened by deforestation, shifting agriculture, and illegal logging and wood harvesting, but it isn't known whether these threats to the ecoregion also pose a threat to this species.
