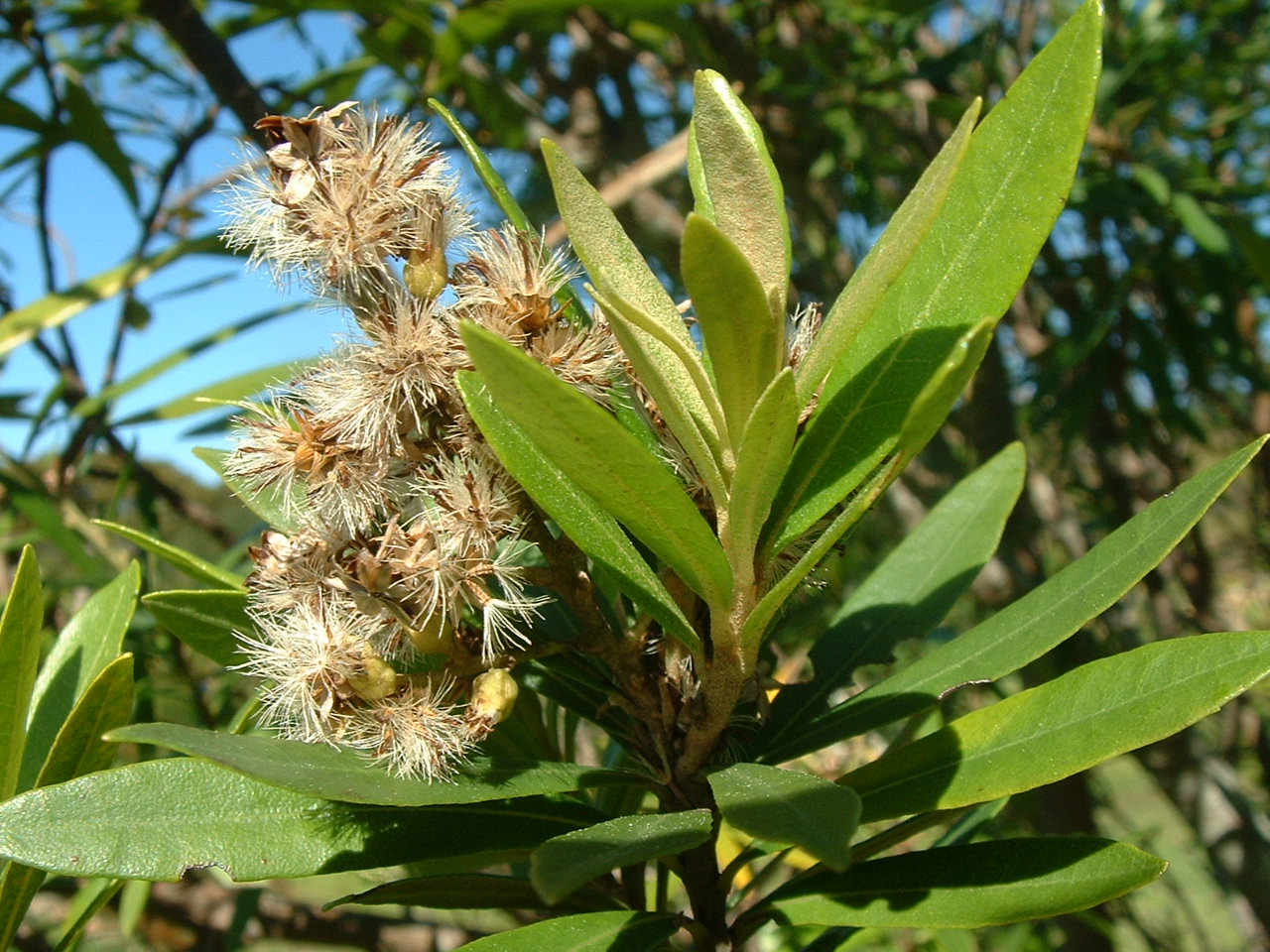

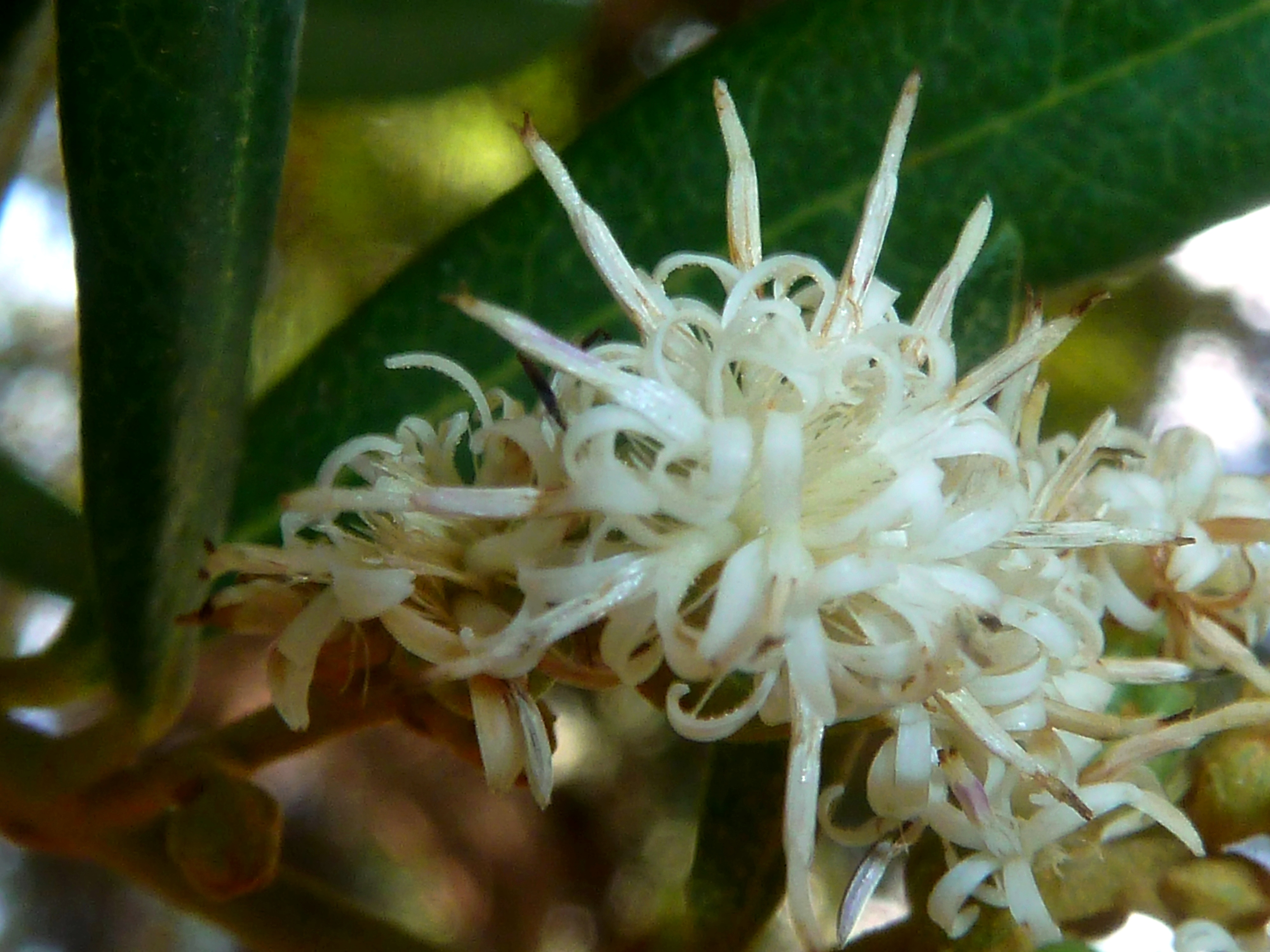

Scientific classification
- Kingdom: Plantae
- Clade: Tracheophytes
- Clade: Angiosperms
- Clade: Eudicots
- Clade: Asterids
- Order: Asterales
- Family: Asteraceae
- Genus: Brachylaena
- Species: B. neriifolia

Binomial name
- Brachylaena neriifolia (L.) R.Br.

= Brachylaena neriifolia =

Cape silver oak

Species of tree

Brachylaena neriifolia, commonly known as the Cape silver oak, water white alder or waterwitels, is a small tree which is native to river valleys in southern Africa.

It grows up to about 6 metres and is usually found along river banks or other moist areas. The leaves of this dioecious tree are lanceolate, and it bears cream-coloured flowers.
