= Ambohijanahary Special Reserve =

- IUCN category IV (habitat/species management area)
- Location within Madagascar
- Nearest city: Tsiroanomandidy
- Coordinates: 18°32′S 45°26′E
- Area: 243.02 km^{2} (93.83 sq mi)
- Established: 28 October 1958
- Governing body: Madagascar National Parks Association

Ambohijanahary Special Reserve is a wildlife reserve in the regions of Menabe and Melaky in Madagascar. The reserve was created in 1958 to protect the sclerophyllous forest between Tsiroanomandidy and Maintirano, as well as protecting the many endemic species of plants and animals.

== Geography ==
The 248 square kilometres (96 sq mi) reserve is on a plateau on the western side of the Bongolava mountain range and near the road from Tsiroanomandidy to Maintirano. Due to the topography and altitude, which ranges from 600 metres (2,000 ft) to 1,800 metres (5,900 ft), there are several habitats within the reserve including sclerophyllous forest. There are extreme changes in the weather during the year with a hot wet season and a long dry season, when most of the streams and rivers run dry. The annual rainfall is 1,001 millimetres (39.4 in) to 1,500 millimetres (59 in) and despite the dry season the numerous valley streams feed the Manambolo River, to the south. This reserve is remote with no infrastructure for visitors.

Most of the people living in and around the reserve are the Sakalava people who depend on beekeeping, fishing, growing corn and rice, and rearing zebu cattle.

== Fauna and flora ==
Depending on altitude there are a number of different habitats within the reserve. There are two types of sclerophyte forest (dense and clear), savanna, open water and bare zones with sand and rocks. Two hundred and eight plant species have been recorded on the reserve with Ocotea cymosa and Ocotea auriculiformis common in the dense sclerophyte forest. Brachylaena merana and Anthocleista madagascariensis can be found on the highest parts of the reserve.

Out of the seventy-eight species of mammals recorded, there is only one diurnal lemur, Von der Decken's sifaka (Propithecus deckenii). Other species which can be seen include eastern woolly lemur (Avahi laniger), the northern ring-tailed mongoose (Galidia elegans) and the lesser long-tailed shrew tenrec (Microgale longicaudata). The bushpig, (Potamochoerus larvatus), is an introduction to Madagascar, and is one of the exceptions to the 97% of the recorded fauna in the reserve being endemic. There are also twenty-one species of reptiles, nine species of amphibians and fifty-seven species of birds.

== See also ==
- List of national parks of Madagascar
