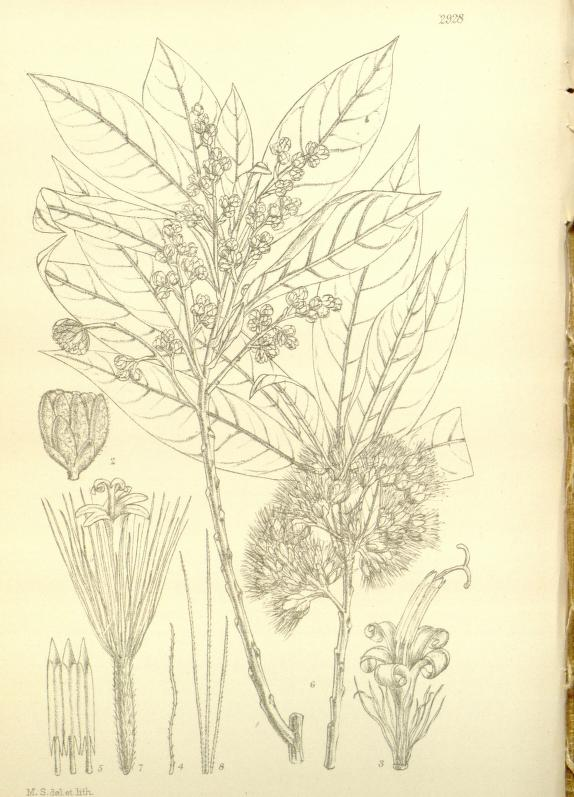

Conservation status
- Near Threatened (IUCN 2.3)}

Scientific classification
- Kingdom: Plantae
- Clade: Tracheophytes
- Clade: Angiosperms
- Clade: Eudicots
- Clade: Asterids
- Order: Asterales
- Family: Asteraceae
- Genus: Brachylaena
- Species: B. huillensis

Binomial name
- Brachylaena huillensis O. Hoffm.

Synonyms
- B. hutchinsii Hutch.

= Brachylaena huillensis =

Species of flowering plant

Brachylaena huillensis, the muhuhu, is a species of flowering plant in the family Asteraceae. It is found in the montane forests of Angola, Kenya, Mozambique, South Africa, Tanzania, Uganda, and Zimbabwe. With a height of up to 40 m (130 ft) it is, with Strobocalyx arborea, a candidate for the tallest of all composites (daisy family), and at up to 60 cm (24 in) trunk diameter also the most massive.

The tree has a very hard wood, which makes it ideal for processing into charcoal; it was Kenya's main source of fuel until the 1830s. It is still a popular fuel source, and in some areas it is threatened by overexploitation. This has led to concern from conservationists over habitat loss for endemic animal species living in Brachylaena cloud forests.
