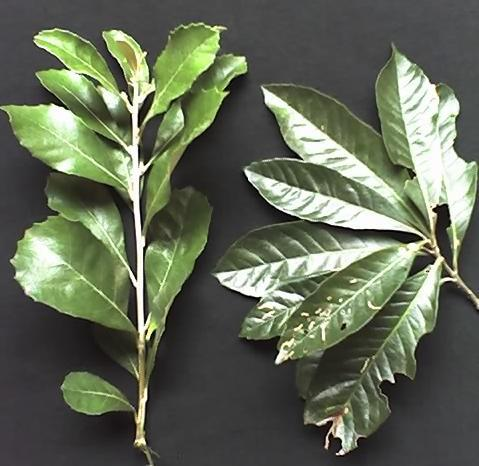

Scientific classification
- Kingdom: Plantae
- Clade: Tracheophytes
- Clade: Angiosperms
- Clade: Eudicots
- Clade: Asterids
- Order: Asterales
- Family: Asteraceae
- Genus: Brachylaena
- Species: B. uniflora

Binomial name
- Brachylaena uniflora Harv.

= Brachylaena uniflora =

Species of flowering plant

Brachylaena uniflora, the tall silver-oak, is a tree that is endemic to South Africa and occurs in KwaZulu-Natal and the Eastern Cape.
