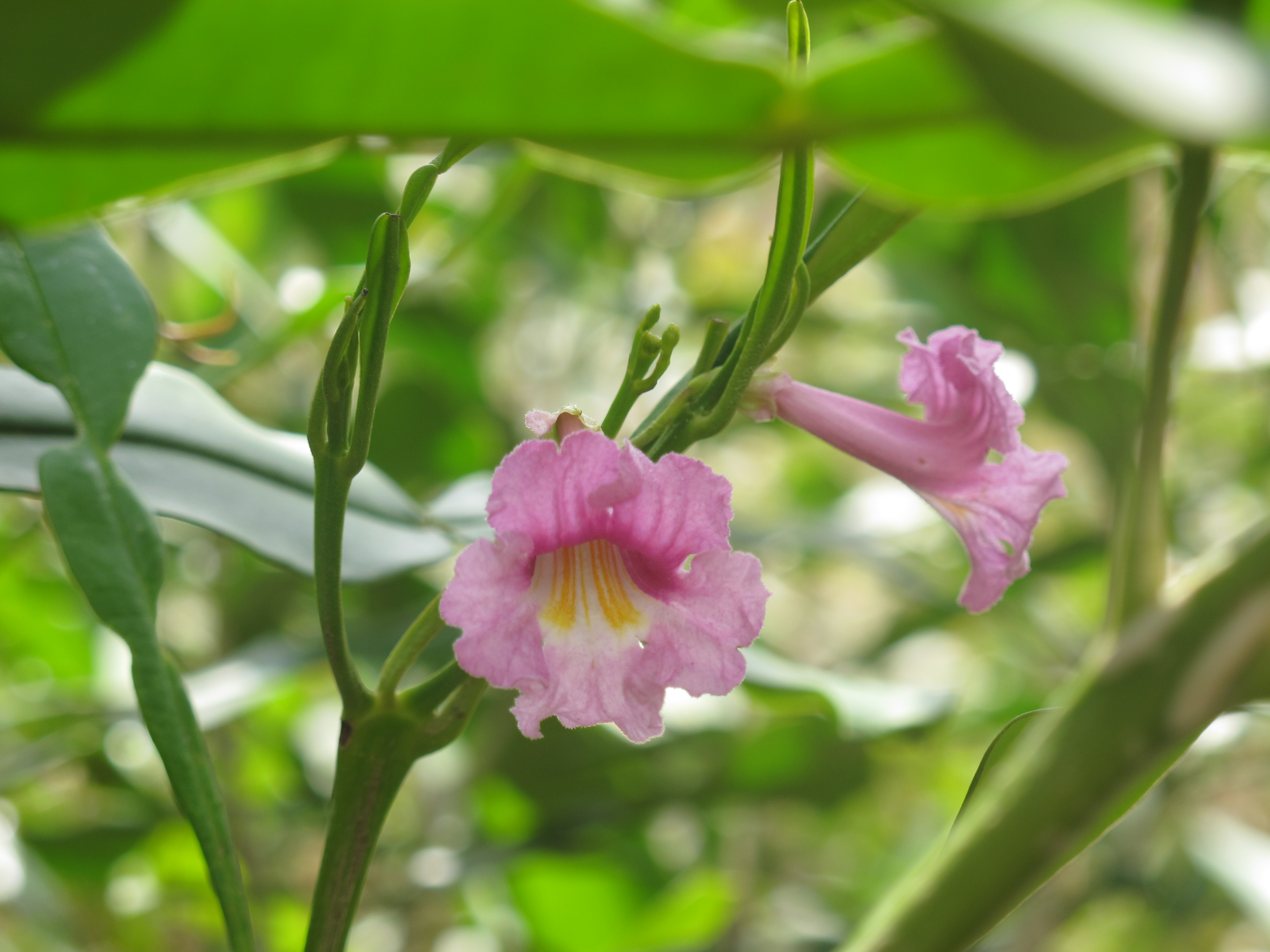
- Flowers of Phyllarthron bojerianum

Scientific classification
- Kingdom: Plantae
- Clade: Tracheophytes
- Clade: Angiosperms
- Clade: Eudicots
- Clade: Asterids
- Order: Lamiales
- Family: Bignoniaceae
- Genus: Phyllarthron; DC.

Synonyms
- Zaa Baill.

= Phyllarthron =

Genus of plants

Phyllarthron is a genus of flowering plants belonging to the family Bignoniaceae. Its native range is the Comoros and Madagascar.

The genus was first described by Augustin Pyramus de Candolle in 1839.

== Species ==
20 species are accepted:

- Phyllarthron antongiliense Capuron
- Phyllarthron arenicola Rakotoaris. & Rabarij.
- Phyllarthron articulatum (Desf.) K.Schum.
- Phyllarthron bernierianum Seem.
- Phyllarthron bilabiatum A.H.Gentry
- Phyllarthron bojerianum DC.
- Phyllarthron cauliflorum Capuron
- Phyllarthron comorense DC.
- Phyllarthron humblotianum H.Perrier
- Phyllarthron ilicifolium (Pers.) H.Perrier
- Phyllarthron laxinervium H.Perrier
- Phyllarthron longipedunculatum Callm. & Phillipson
- Phyllarthron megaphyllum Capuron
- Phyllarthron megapterum H.Perrier
- Phyllarthron multiflorum H.Perrier
- Phyllarthron nocturnum Zjhra
- Phyllarthron sahamalazensis Zjhra
- Phyllarthron suarezense H.Perrier
- Phyllarthron subumbellatum H.Perrier
- Phyllarthron vokoaninensis Zjhra
