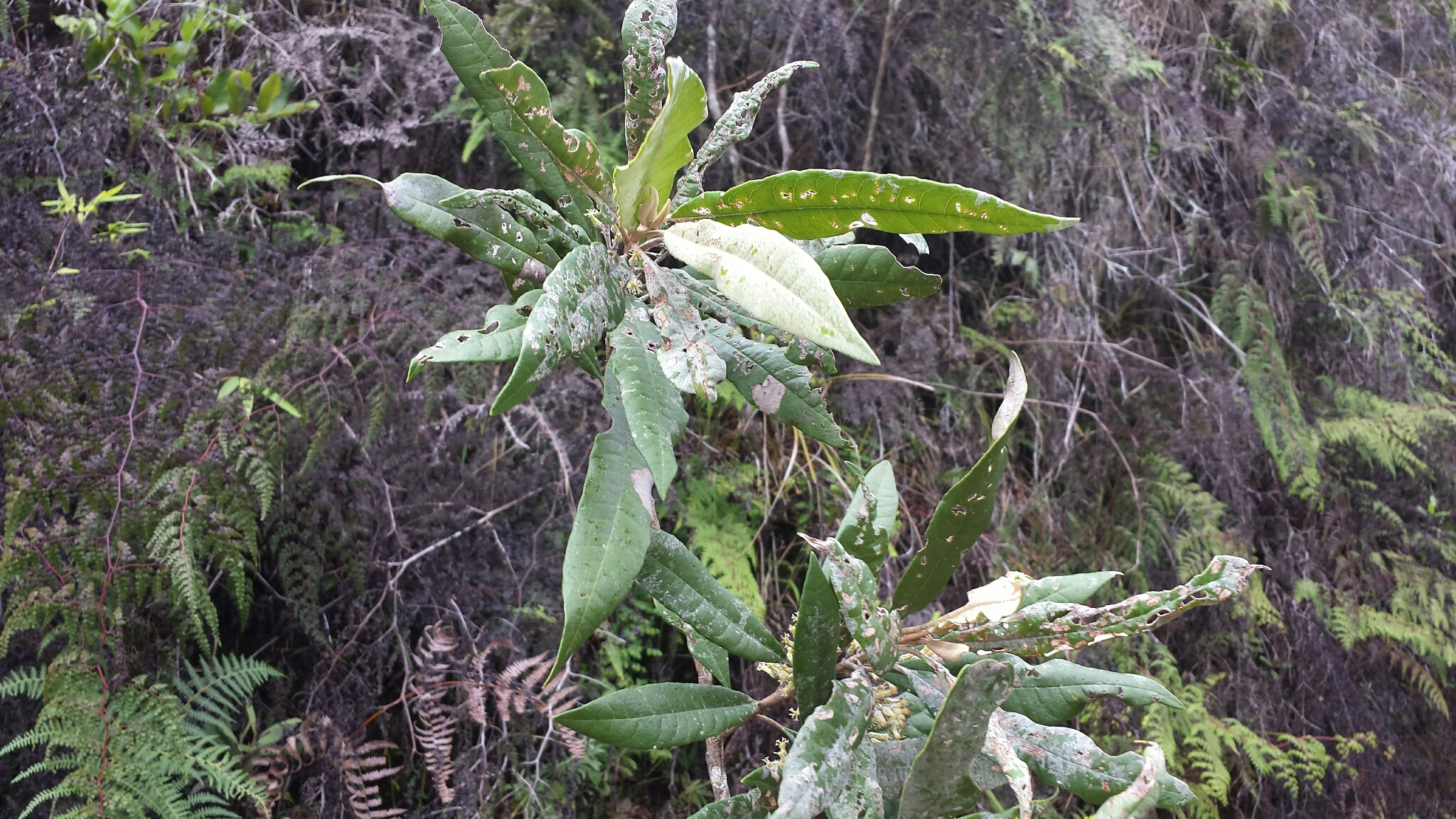

Conservation status
- Least Concern (IUCN 2.3)

Scientific classification
- Kingdom: Plantae
- Clade: Embryophytes
- Clade: Tracheophytes
- Clade: Spermatophytes
- Clade: Angiosperms
- Clade: Eudicots
- Clade: Asterids
- Order: Asterales
- Family: Asteraceae
- Genus: Brachylaena
- Species: B. ramiflora

Binomial name
- Brachylaena ramiflora Humbert

= Brachylaena ramiflora =

Species of flowering plant

Brachylaena ramiflora is a tree belonging to the family Asteraceae and is endemic to Madagascar.

The plant has three varieties:

- Brachylaena ramiflora var. bernieri (Baill.) Humbert
- Brachylaena ramiflora var. comorensis
- Brachylaena ramiflora var. ramiflora
