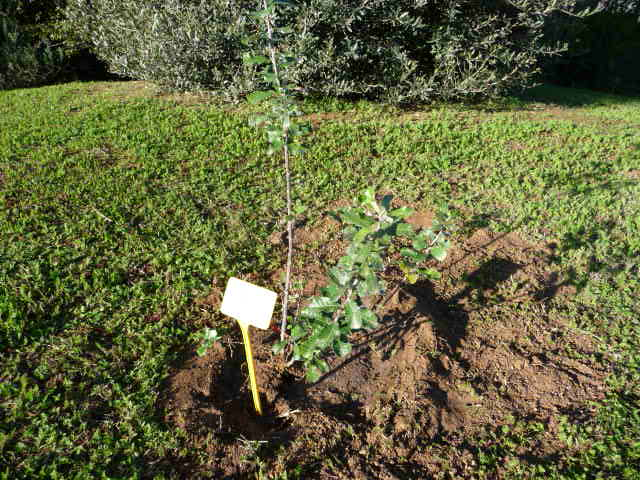

Conservation status
- Least Concern (IUCN 2.3)

Scientific classification
- Kingdom: Plantae
- Clade: Tracheophytes
- Clade: Angiosperms
- Clade: Eudicots
- Clade: Asterids
- Order: Asterales
- Family: Asteraceae
- Genus: Brachylaena
- Species: B. elliptica

Binomial name
- Brachylaena elliptica (Thunb.) Less.

Synonyms
- Tarchonanthus camphoratus Houtt. ex DC.; Tarchonanthus ellipticus Thunb.

= Brachylaena elliptica =

Species of flowering plant

Brachylaena elliptica, the bitter-leaf silver-oak, is a shrub or small tree that occurs from Gqeberha in the Eastern Cape to southern KwaZulu-Natal. The tree grows in coastal and riparian forest as well as in bushveld in low-lying regions. It is listed as secure on the SANBI Red List. It is endemic to South Africa.
