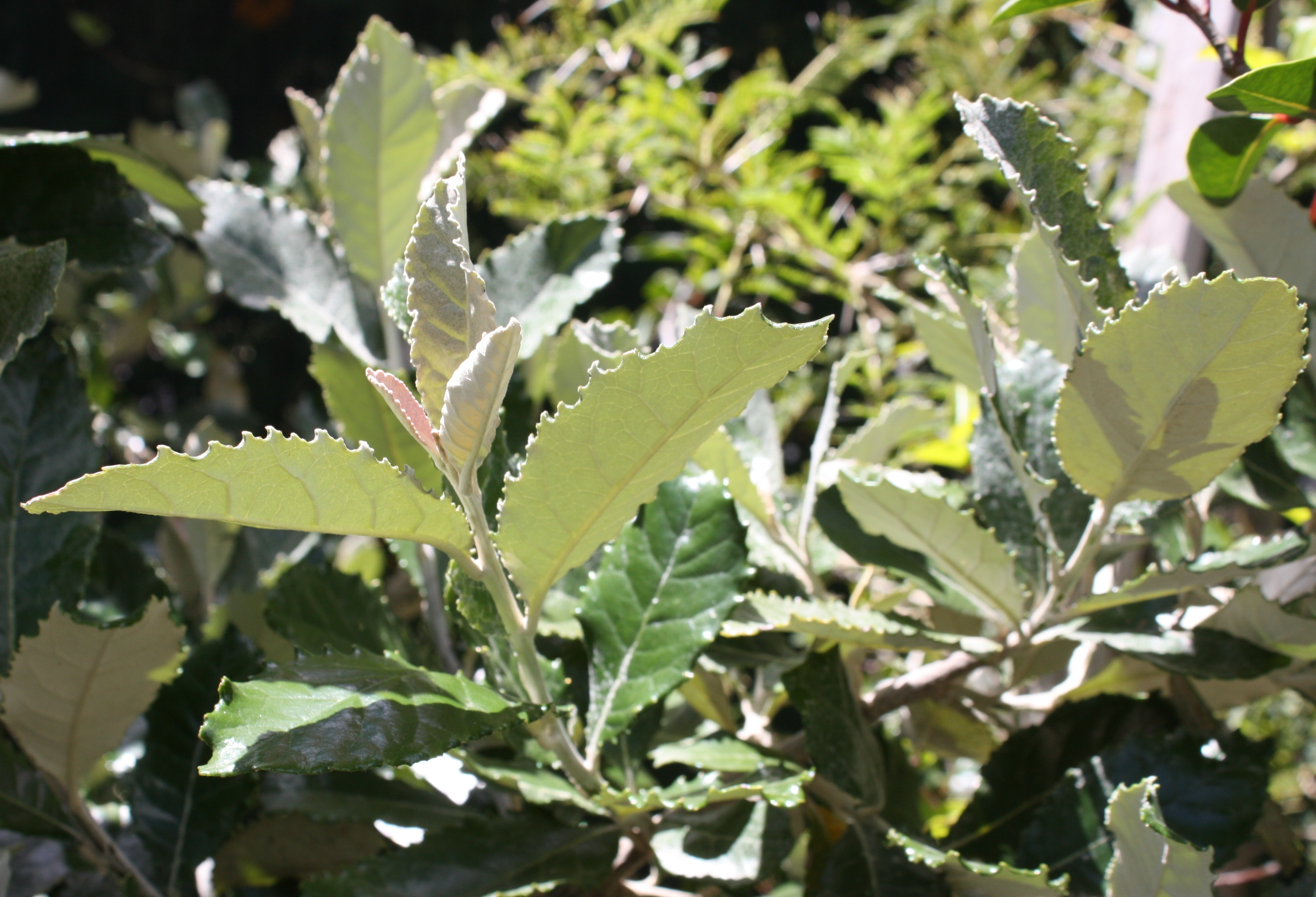
- Branches of Brachylaena discolor
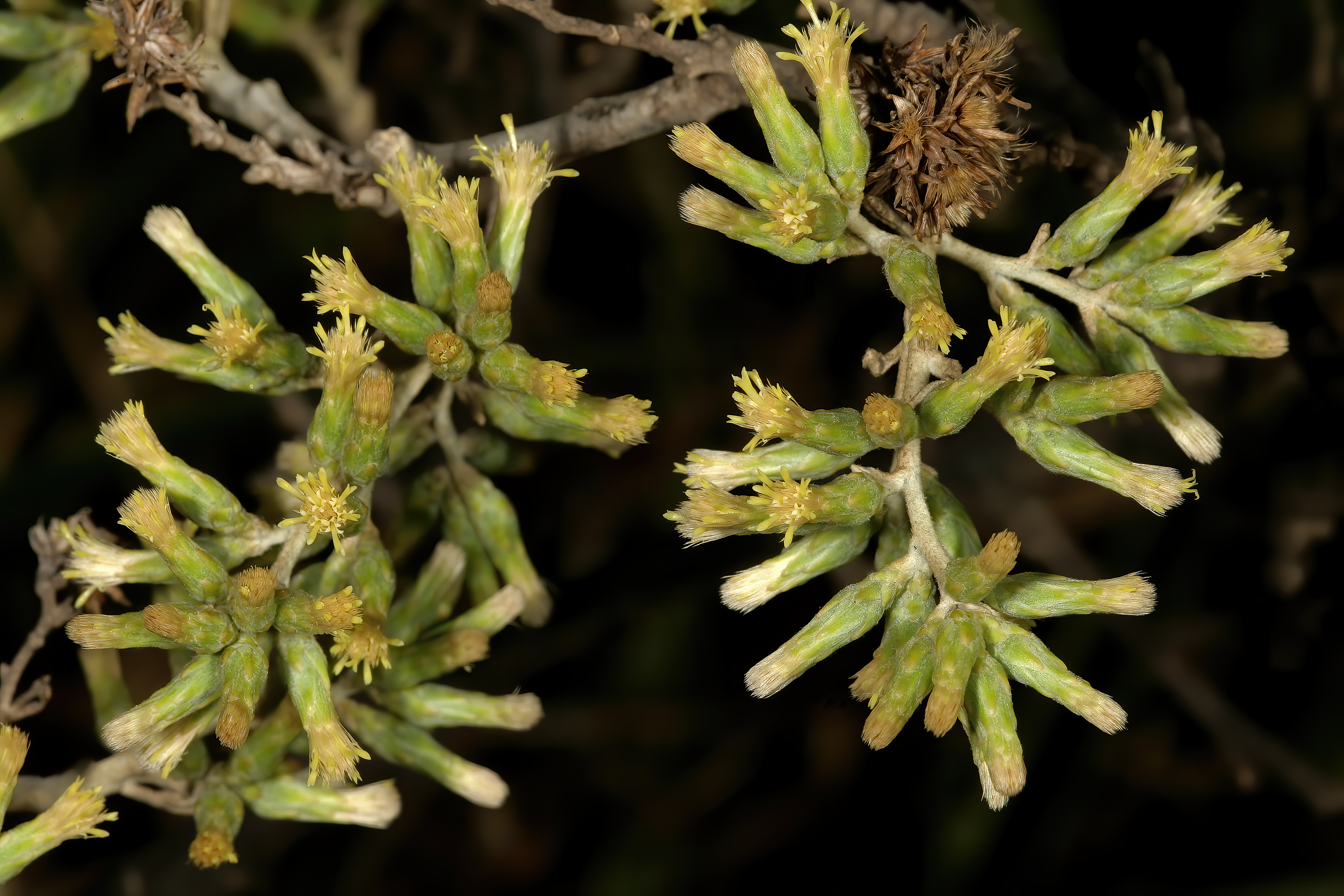
- Inflorescences of female Brachylaena huillensis plant

Scientific classification
- Kingdom: Plantae
- Clade: Tracheophytes
- Clade: Angiosperms
- Clade: Eudicots
- Clade: Asterids
- Order: Asterales
- Family: Asteraceae
- Subfamily: Carduoideae
- Tribe: Tarchonantheae
- Genus: Brachylaena; R.Br.

Species
- See text

Synonyms
- Oligocarpha Cass.; Synchodendron Bojer ex DC.

= Brachylaena =

Genus of flowering plants

Brachylaena is a genus of flowering plants in the aster, or composite, family Asteraceae or Compositae. Several are endemic to Madagascar, and the others are distributed in mainland Africa, especially the southern regions.

These are trees and shrubs with alternately arranged leaves. One of these, Brachylaena merana of Madagascar, is the tallest of all composites ('daisy trees") at up to 40 m (130 ft), and Brachylaena huillensis of East Africa is of similar height (but see also Strobocalyx arborea). They are dioecious, with male and female flowers occurring on separate individuals. The flower heads are somewhat disc-shaped. Heads with female flowers are larger and produce larger pappi.

B. huillensis is the only widespread species, growing as a dominant tree in Brachylaena woodlands and a common species in some eastern African forests. It provides critical habitat for many animal species. It is also sought after for its wood and has been overexploited.

Species

- Brachylaena discolor DC.
- Brachylaena elliptica Less.
- Brachylaena glabra (L.f.) Druce
- Brachylaena huillensis O.Hoffm. – lowveld silver-oak, muhuhu
- Brachylaena ilicifolia (Lam.) E.Phillips & Schweick.
- Brachylaena merana Humbert
- Brachylaena microphylla Humbert
- Brachylaena neriifolia (L.) R.Br.
- Brachylaena perrieri Humbert
- Brachylaena ramiflora Humbert
- Brachylaena stellulifera Humbert
- Brachylaena uniflora Harv.

Some species are subject of dispute:

- Brachylaena rotundata S.Moore is seen by some as Brachylaena discolor var. rotundata (S.Moore) Beentje
- Brachylaena transvaalensis Hutch. ex E.Phillips & Schweick. is seen as synonym of Brachylaena discolor var. transvaalensis (E.Phillips & Schweick.) Beentje
