= Ephippiandra =

Scientific classification
- Kingdom: Plantae
- Clade: Tracheophytes
- Clade: Angiosperms
- Clade: Magnoliids
- Order: Laurales
- Family: Monimiaceae
- Genus: Ephippiandra; Decne.

Synonyms
- Hedycaryopsis Danguy

Genus of plants

Ephippiandra is a genus of flowering plants belonging to the family Monimiaceae. Its native range is Madagascar.

== Species ==
Seven species are currently accepted:

- Ephippiandra domatiata Lorence
- Ephippiandra madagascariensis (Danguy) Lorence
- Ephippiandra masoalensis Lorence
- Ephippiandra microphylla (Perkins) Cavaco
- Ephippiandra myrtoidea Decne.
- Ephippiandra perrieri (Cavaco) Lorence
- Ephippiandra tsaratanensis (Cavaco) Lorence
