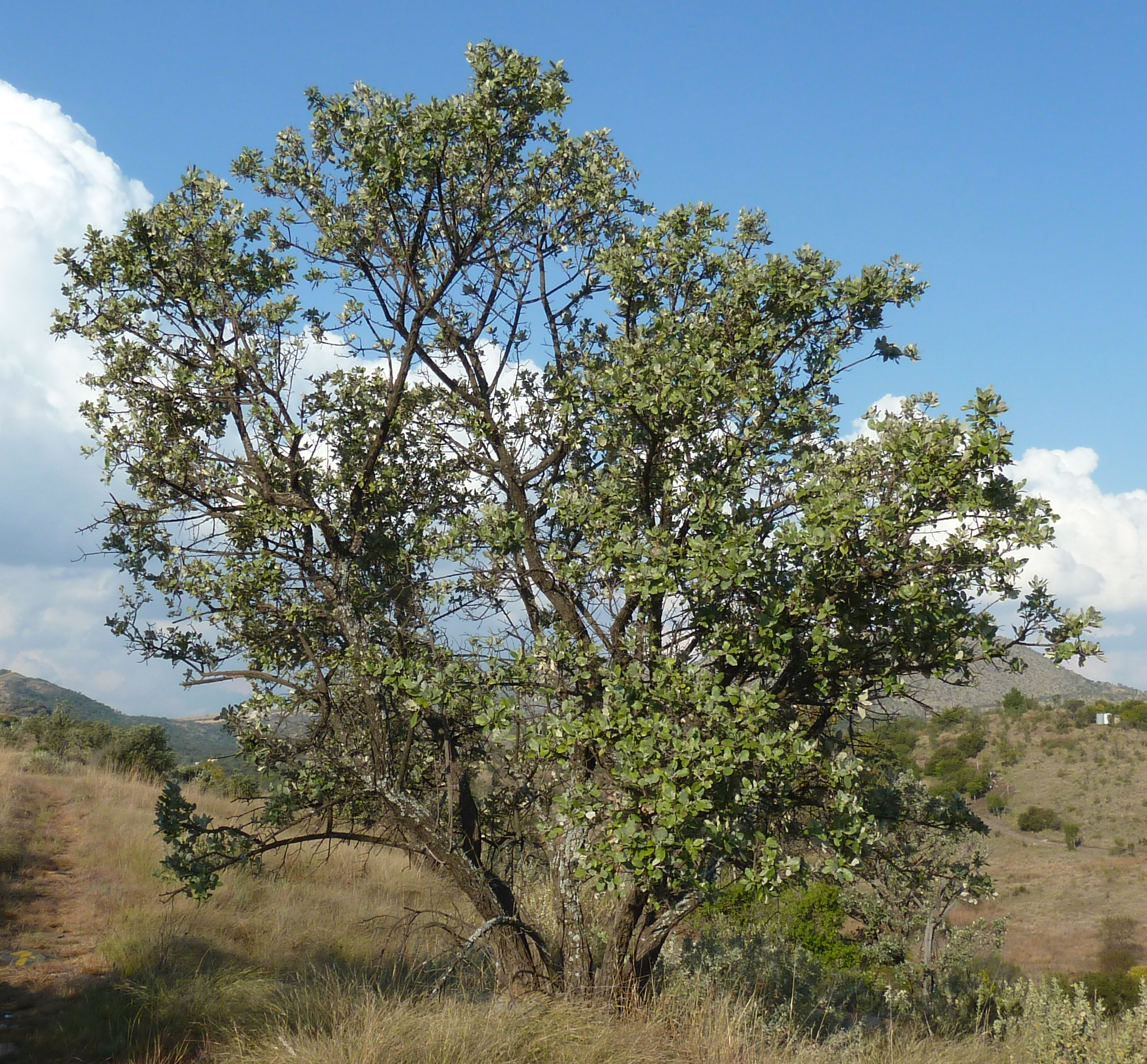

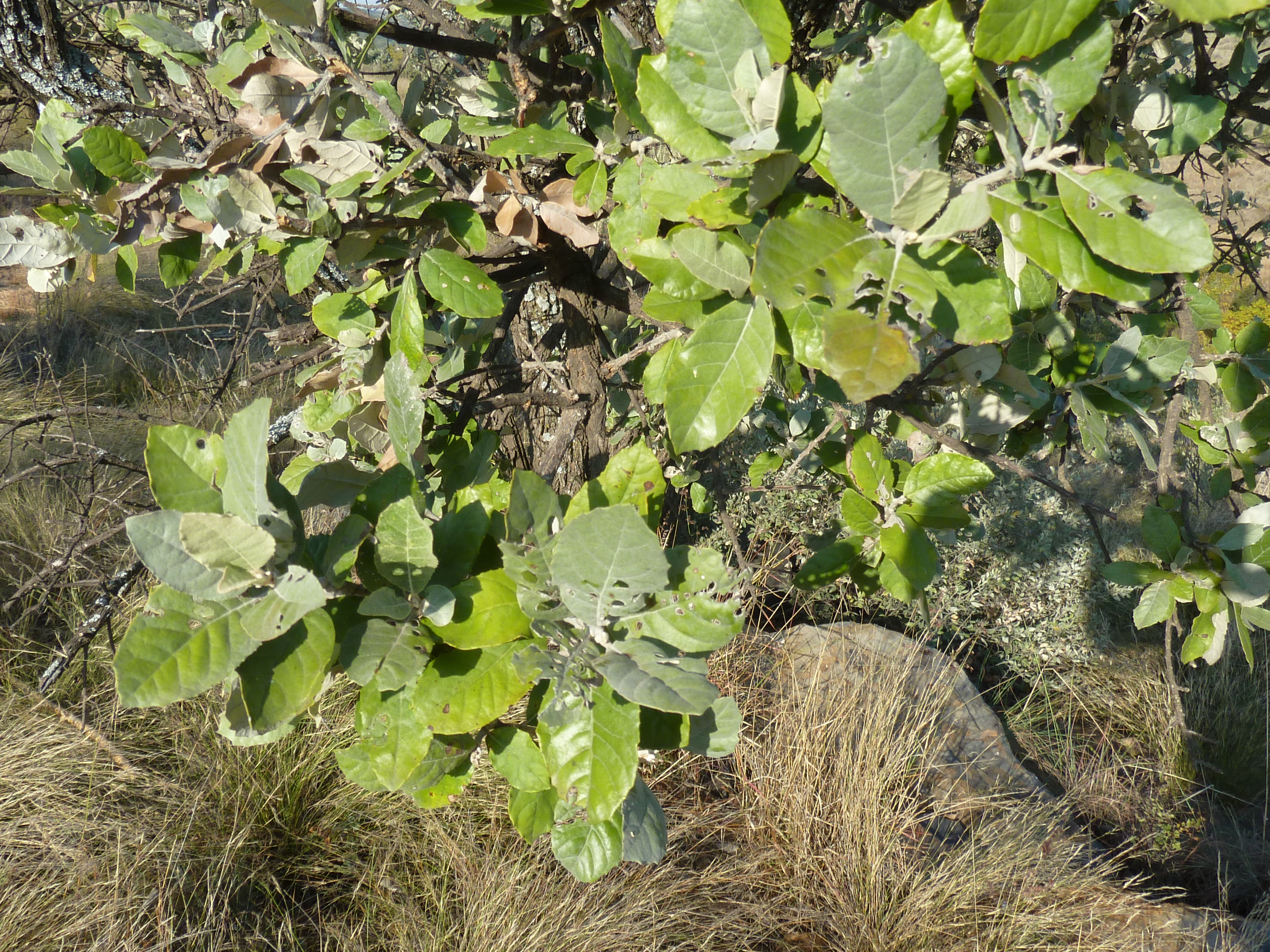

Scientific classification
- Kingdom: Plantae
- Clade: Tracheophytes
- Clade: Angiosperms
- Clade: Eudicots
- Clade: Asterids
- Order: Asterales
- Family: Asteraceae
- Genus: Brachylaena
- Species: B. rotundata

Binomial name
- Brachylaena rotundata S.Moore

Synonyms
- Brachylaena rhodesiana S.Moore

= Brachylaena rotundata =

Species of flowering plant

Brachylaena rotundata is an occasionally deciduous Southern African shrub or small tree growing to some 8m in height and of the family Asteraceae. It occurs in eastern Botswana, Transvaal, Mozambique, Zambia and Zimbabwe, growing in open woodland, on rocky koppies and slopes, and on stream banks. Kew accepts Brachylaena rotundata S. Moore as a species while 'Flora of Mozambique' treats it as a variety of Brachylaena discolor DC. It bears attractive foliage, green on the upper surface and silver-grey on the lower, leaves turning slightly reddish in autumn.

Leaves with petioles from 2 mm to 7 mm. long, lamina 4–15 x 2.5–6 cm., larger on coppice shoots, broadly oblanceolate or elliptic, obtuse to rounded at the apex, cuneate or rounded base, entire, occasionally coarsely dentate near the apex; upper surface araneous when young, or glabrescent; lower surface greyish tomentellous with prominent veins. Capitula sometimes preceding the leaves, young synflorescences with buds in axillary and terminal spikes, mature synflorescences with numerous capitula in dense terminal panicles 4–40 cm. long, or in short raceme-like panicles in axils of old leaves. Involucres cyathiform to obconic. Phyllaries minutely glandular outside, subobtuse, margins ciliolate, the outer phyllaries from c. 1 mm. long and ovate, the inner to c. 5 mm. long becoming lorate-lanceolate, narrowly obtuse or blunt at the apex; the outermost 5–8 series decreasing in size and extending down to the base of the capitulum stalk. Male flowers: corollas dull-yellow, 3–5 mm. long, lobes c. 1.5 mm. long and ± recurved; pappus uniseriate, setae 3–4 mm. long, subplumose, the seta barbs exceeding the seta axis in width. Female flowers: corollas dull-yellow, 3–5 mm. long, filiform, lobes erect up to c. 0.5 mm. long; achenes c. 4 mm. long, subcylindric-fusiform, narrowly c. 8-ribbed, pubescent; pappus 2-several-seriate, setae 4–5 mm. long, ± terete or flattened, seta barbs ± equalling the seta axis in width.

— Flora Zambesiaca

This species produces a dense and strong creamy-brown timber, but not of any useful size or straightness.
