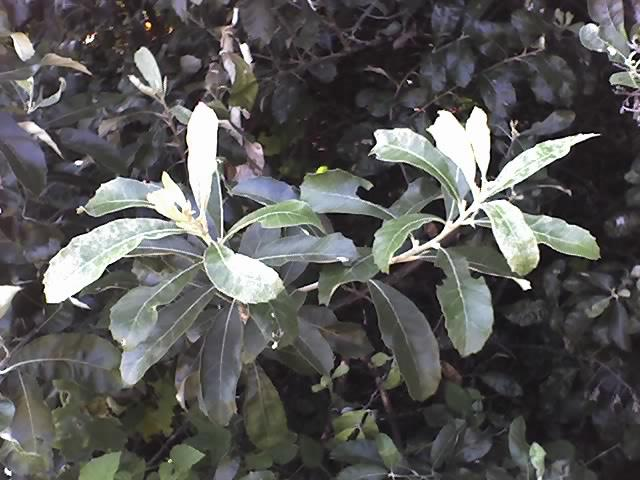

Scientific classification
- Kingdom: Plantae
- Clade: Embryophytes
- Clade: Tracheophytes
- Clade: Angiosperms
- Clade: Eudicots
- Clade: Asterids
- Order: Asterales
- Family: Asteraceae
- Genus: Brachylaena
- Species: B. discolor

Binomial name
- Brachylaena discolor DC.

Synonyms
- B. natalensis Sch.Bip.

= Brachylaena discolor =

Species of flowering plant

Brachylaena discolor is a species of flowering plant in the aster family, Asteraceae. It is native to Africa, where it occurs in Mozambique, South Africa, and Eswatini. Its common names include coast silver oak and coastal silver oak.

== Description ==
This species is a shrub or tree up to about 10 meters tall, but known to reach 27 to 29 meters at times. The branches are brown or purple-tinged, and hairy when new. The leaves are oval or oblong and usually up to 12 centimeters long. They are smooth-edged to toothed to spine-toothed. They are mostly hairless and a shiny dull green on top and grayish hairy underneath. Flowers are borne in large panicles at the ends of branches and shorter panicles in the leaf axils. The species is dioecious, with flower heads that look like "plump shaving brushes". Male plants have heads with short phyllaries and a single layer of pappus hairs. Female heads have longer phyllaries and multiple layers of pappus hairs.

== Ecology ==
The plant grows in coastal forests, on the edges of mangroves, and along rivers.

The flowers produce abundant nectar and attract insects and birds. It is a good honey plant. The leaves may be browsed by antelopes such as nyala, bushbuck, and duikers.

This species has become naturalized in Queensland, and is a potential weed.

== Uses ==
The yellow wood is strong and has been used for many purposes, including the construction of boats, fences, housing and roofing, axles, tools, and knobkierries. It is considered a valuable carving wood. The ash was used in the production of soap.

The plant was used medicinally by native Africans and European settlers. It has been used to treat kidney conditions, diabetes, gastrointestinal bleeding, intestinal parasites, and chest pain.

It is also cultivated as an ornamental plant for gardens and landscaping. It tolerates coastal habitats and can be used to stabilize dunes.

== Taxonomy ==
Some authors divide the species into two varieties, var. discolor and var. transvaalensis (forest silver oak or Natal silver oak). Others treat var. transvaalensis as Brachylaena transvaalensis, a separate species. Its leaves have a distinctive shape and its flower heads are smaller and different in morphology.

== See also ==
- Maputaland-Pondoland-Albany Hotspot

== Gallery ==
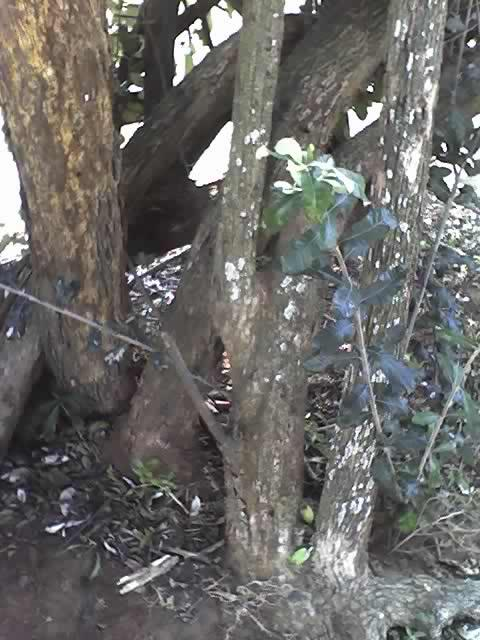
Stems

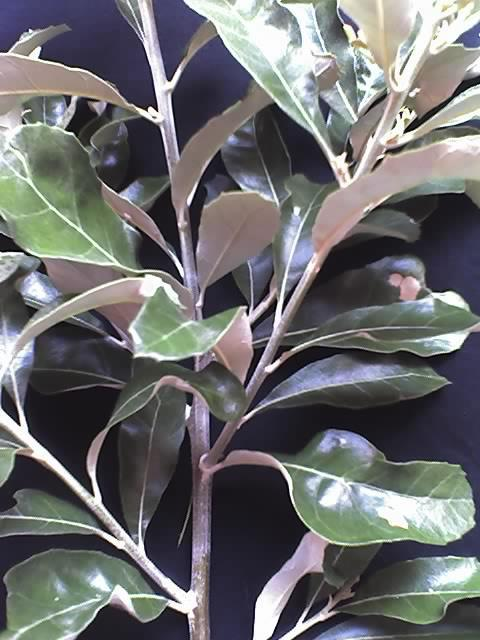
Foliage
