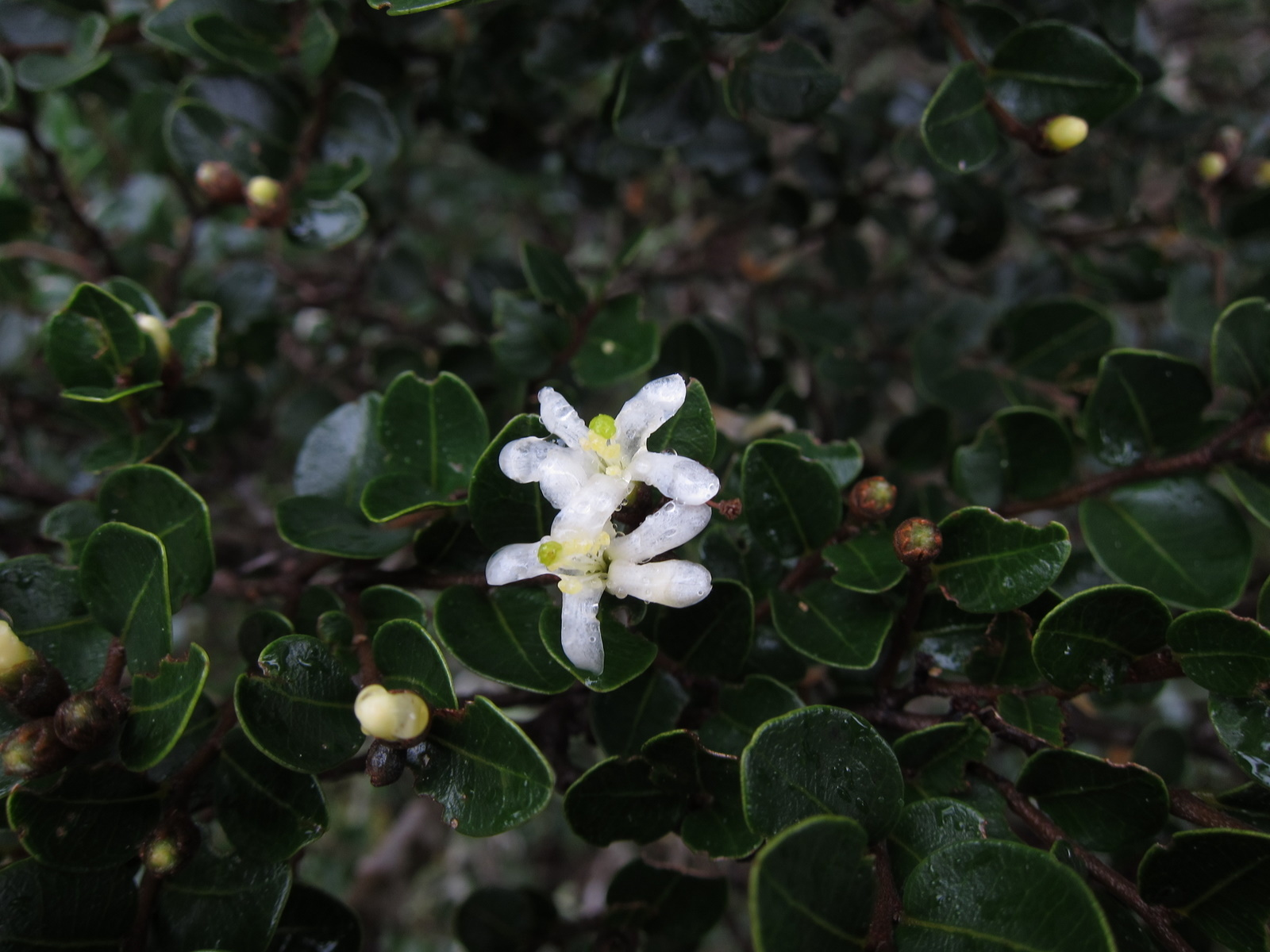

Conservation status
- Least Concern (IUCN 3.1)

Scientific classification
- Kingdom: Plantae
- Clade: Tracheophytes
- Clade: Angiosperms
- Clade: Eudicots
- Clade: Rosids
- Order: Malvales
- Family: Sarcolaenaceae
- Genus: Leptolaena
- Species: L. pauciflora

Binomial name
- Leptolaena pauciflora Baker

= Leptolaena pauciflora =

Species of flowering plant

Leptolaena pauciflora is a species of flowering plant in the Sarcolaenaceae family. It is found only in Madagascar. Its natural habitats are subtropical or tropical moist lowland forests, subtropical or tropical high-altitude shrubland, and sandy shores. It is threatened by habitat loss. The specific epithet pauciflora is Latin for 'few-flowered'.
