= Madagascar ericoid thickets =

Ecoregion in Madagascar

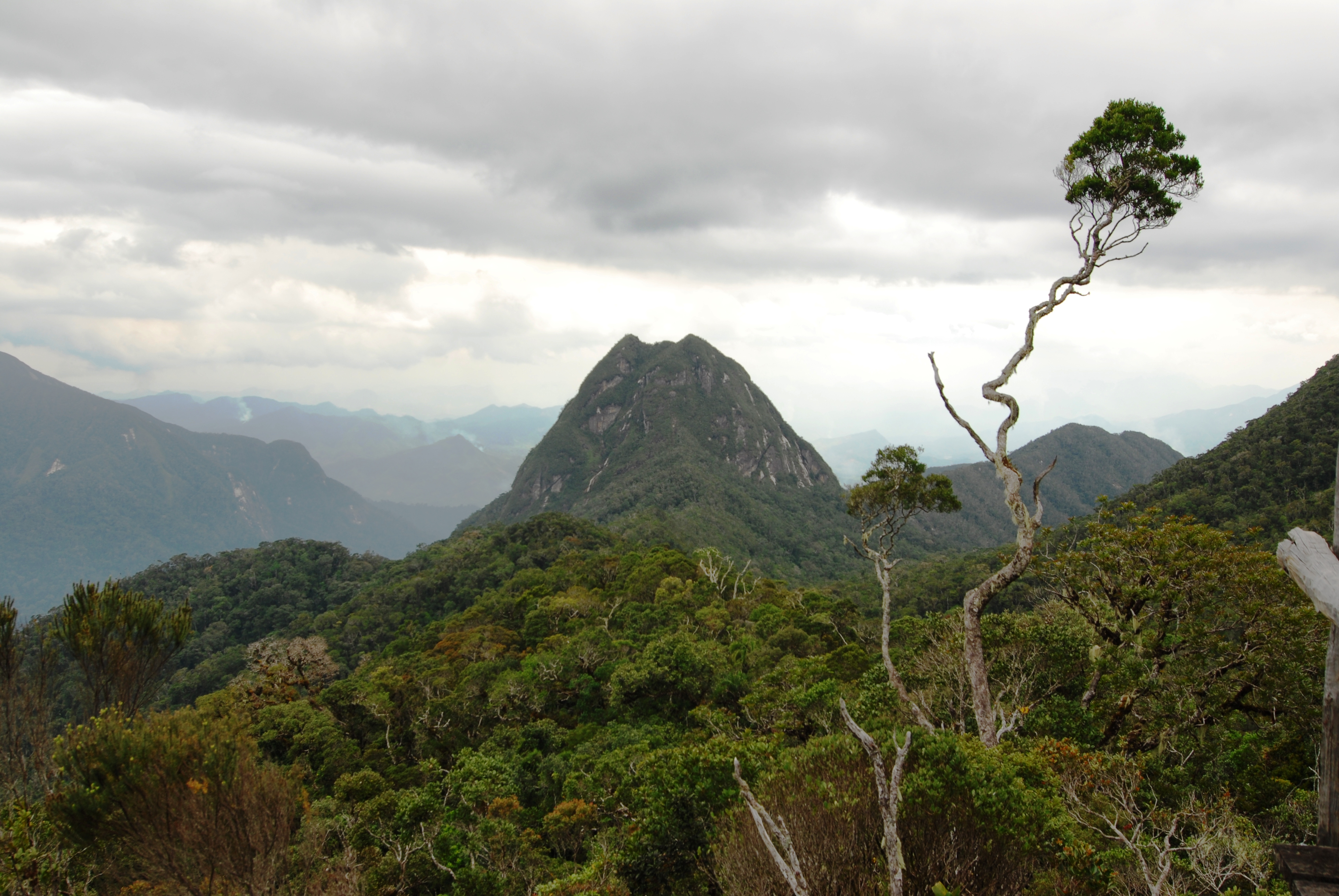
- Marojejy National Park, with ericoid thicket on the summits and subhumid forest below

Ecology
- Realm: Afrotropical
- Biome: Montane shrubland
- Borders: Madagascar subhumid forests

Geography
- Area: 1,295 km^{2} (500 mi^{2})
- Country: Madagascar
- Elevation: 1,800–2,900 metres (5,900–9,500 ft)
- Coordinates: 19°25′S 47°12′E
- Geology: metamorphic and igneous basement rocks
- Climate type: Subtropical highland (Cwb)
- Soil types: thin, nutrient-poor

Conservation
- Conservation status: critical/endangered
- Global 200: not included
- Protected: 32.1%

The Madagascar ericoid thickets is a montane shrubland ecoregion, found at higher elevations on Madagascar's four major mountains.

== Geography ==
The ecoregion covers the area above 1800 m elevation on (from north to south) Tsaratanana (2,876 m), Marojejy (2,133 m), Ankaratra (2,643 m), and Andringitra Massif (2,658 m). The ericoid thickets are surrounded at lower elevations by the Madagascar subhumid forests ecoregion. The total area of the ecoregion is 1,300 km^{2} (500 sq mi). On Tsaratanana the thickets are higher up, starting above 2,500m. There are smaller areas of thicket in Anjanaharibe-Sud Special Reserve in the north and Andohahela National Park to the south.

== Flora ==
The main plant community is thickets. The thickets are composed of evergreen woody shrubs and low trees, which form a single, often impenetrable stratum never more than 6 meters tall. The shrubs and trees typically have an ericoid habit, with short, twisted stems and ericoid, cupressoid, or myrtilloid leaves.

Characteristic shrubs of the ericoid thickets are from the plant families Asteraceae (species of Psiadia, Helichrysum, Stoebe, and Stenocline), Ericaceae (species of Erica, Agauria, and Vaccinium), Rhamnaceae (Phylica), and Rubiaceae. Low trees, widely-spaced, rise a little higher than the shrub canopy. Native trees include Agauria salicifolia, Ilex mitis, Neocussonia bojeri, Razafimandimbisonia minor, Dodonaea madagascariensis, Tambourissa gracilis, Podocarpus rostratus, Vitex humbertii, Faurea forficuliflora, Pittosporum sp., and several species of Pterophylla. Other plants include the arborescent monocots Dracaena reflexa and Pandanus alpestris. Lichens, mosses, grasses, sedges, and species of Impatiens inhabit the ground layer. Epiphytic mosses and lichens, along with a few small orchids, grow plentifully on the branches of shrubs and trees.

The thickets are home a large number of endemic plants, many of whose closest relatives live in South Africa and the highlands of East Africa. Andringitra alone is home to 150 vascular endemics, including 25 species of orchid. The palm Dypsis acuminum is endemic to the Manongarivo Massif.

In much of the ecoregion, secondary grassland, established by regular livestock grazing and burning, has almost entirely replaced the original thicket vegetation. The most common grasses on Ankaratra's secondary grasslands are Pentameris natalensis, P. humbertii, Andropogon trichozygus, Anthoxanthum madagascariense, Digitaria ankaratrensis, Agrostis elliotii, Merxmuellera macowanii, Brachypodium perrieri, Poa madecassa, P. ankaratrensis, and Festuca camusiana. Secondary grassland species are also found in mountain bogs.

== Fauna ==
These high points of Madagascar are home to less diverse animal life than on the lower slopes, but with a high proportion of endemics. The area was not thoroughly researched until the 1990s. There are at least ten species of endemic and near-endemic reptiles including the dwarf gecko Lygodactylus arnoulti.

== Threats and preservation ==
The thickets are vulnerable to fire, and many have been converted to cattle pasture. The widespread conversion of thickets to secondary grasslands may be relatively recent. In 1777 Ankaratra was reported covered with forest. Until the end of the 19th century Andringitra's thickets were a refuge from trouble for local people and their flocks. Ankaratra's and Andringitra's thickets were mostly converted to pasture in the 20th century.

Andringitra, Tsaratanana, and Marojejy are all protected areas, and Andringitra's thickets have partially recovered since it was protected.

32.1% of the ecoregion is in protected areas. Protected areas include Marojejy National Park, Tsaratanana Strict Nature Reserve, Andringitra National Park, and Rainforests of the Atsinanana World Heritage Site.

== See also ==
- Ecoregions of Madagascar
