= Faurea forficuliflora =

Conservation status
- Least Concern (IUCN 3.1)

Scientific classification
- Kingdom: Plantae
- Clade: Tracheophytes
- Clade: Angiosperms
- Clade: Eudicots
- Order: Proteales
- Family: Proteaceae
- Genus: Faurea
- Species: F. forficuliflora

Binomial name
- Faurea forficuliflora Baker

Synonyms
- Loranthus forficuliflora Bojer ex Baker

Species of tree

Faurea forficuliflora is a tree that forms part of the Faurea genus and is endemic to Madagascar.

== Sources ==
- Plants of the World Online
