= Madagascar subhumid forests =

Ecoregion in Central Madagascar

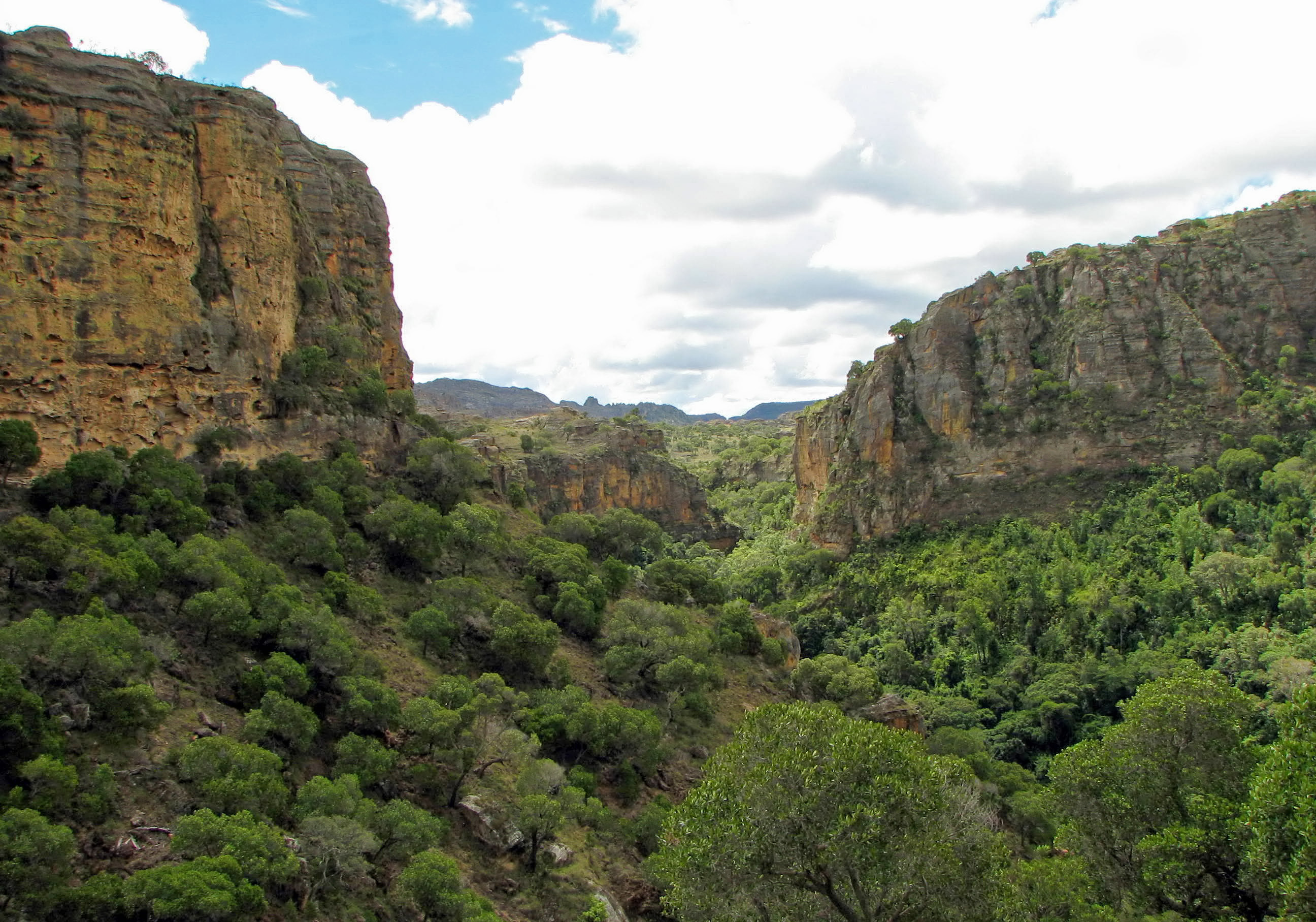
- Isalo National Park

Ecology
- Realm: Afrotropical
- Biome: Tropical moist broadleaf forest
- Borders: Madagascar ericoid thickets, Madagascar lowland forests, Madagascar spiny forests, Madagascar succulent woodlands, Madagascar dry deciduous forests
- Animals: Lac Alaotra bamboo lemur, chameleons

Geography
- Area: 199,600 km^{2} (77,100 mi^{2})
- Country: Madagascar
- Elevation: 600–1,800 metres (2,000–5,900 ft)
- Coordinates: 18°56′S 47°31′E
- Climate type: Tropical monsoon climate (Am), tropical savanna climate (Aw), humid subtropical climate (Cwa)

Conservation
- Conservation status: Critical/endangered
- Global 200: included
- Protected: 7.679%

The Madagascar subhumid forests are a tropical moist broadleaf forest ecoregion that covers most of the Central Highlands of the island of Madagascar. They are included in the WWF's Global 200 list of outstanding ecoregions. Most of the original habitats have been lost due to human pressure.

== Geography ==
The Madagascar subhumid forests ecoregion covers Madagascar's highlands, which extend north and south along the length of the island, above approximately 800 metres (2,600 ft) elevation on the east and above 600 metres (2,000 ft) meters elevation on the west.

The Central Highlands is the largest highland region on the island, extending from approximately 16º to 23º south. The Central Highlands include Ankaratra and the Andringitra Massif, which is home to Pic Boby (2,658 m), the Central Highlands' highest peak.

The Northern Highlands includes the Tsaratanana Massif in the north, home to Maromokotro (2,876 m) Madagascar's highest peak, and the massifs of Marojejy to the northeast and Manongarivo to the northwest. It is separated from the Central Highlands by the Mandritsara Window, an east–west-running gap in the mountains with elevations below 800 meters.

The Southern Highlands include the Anosyenne Mountains and adjacent uplands in the southern part of the island. It is separated from the Central Highlands by the Menaharaka Window, another gap below 800 meters elevation, at approximately 23°S latitude. The highest peak in the Southern Highlands is Pic d'Andohahela at 1,959 meters.

The ecoregion includes some smaller outlying peaks, notably Montagne d'Ambre near the northern tip of Madagascar, the Makay Massif in west-central Madasgascar, and the Isalo and Analavelona massifs in the southwest of the island.

The subhumid forests extend to the northwest coast in the Sambirano region, including the island of Nosy Be. Most of that area is now covered by secondary grasslands and agriculture, with forest reduced to fragmented patches. The Sambirano region, also known as the Sambirano Domain, is a particular centre of endemism.

The ecoregion has an area of approximately 199,600 square kilometers (77,100 sq mi). The highlands catch the wet northeast trade winds, and the eastern slopes generally receive more rainfall. The ecoregion includes the headwaters of most of Madagascar's rivers, and wetlands like Lake Alaotra. Areas to the south, west, and north lie in the drier rain shadow of the highlands. The subhumid forests are bounded at lower elevations by the humid Madagascar lowland forests along the coastal strip to the east, by the Madagascar dry deciduous forests to the north and west, and by the sub-arid Madagascar succulent forests and Madagascar spiny thickets to the southwest and south. In four areas above 1,800–2,000 metres (5,900–6,600 ft) elevation, the subhumid forests transition to the montane Madagascar ericoid thickets.

Montagne d'Ambre near the northern tip of the island, contains a significant pocket of subhumid forest, surrounded at lower elevations by dry deciduous forest, as do Ankaratra, upland near Tsaratanana, Andringitra Massif, Ambohitantely Reserve, and the Ambohijanahary area. The subhumid forests ecoregion also includes the disjunct Analavelona and Isalo massifs to the southwest, surrounded by succulent forests at lower elevations.

== Flora ==
The ecoregion is home to several distinct plant communities, which differ with elevation, rainfall, and soils. These include moist montane forest, sclerophyllous montane forest, tapia forest, rupicolous shrubland, and grassland.

The original flora of the ecoregion has been much altered by human use; extensive areas have been cleared for agriculture, grazing, and rice cultivation, and some exotic species such as Acacia and Eucalyptus have been introduced. Moist evergreen forests are less susceptible to fire than the sclerophyll forests and ericoid thickets. Frequent human-set fires have transformed some of the ecoregion's former forests into savannas and grasslands. Grassland now covers much of the highlands, but the extent to which the grasslands are the result of human intervention is still subject to debate.

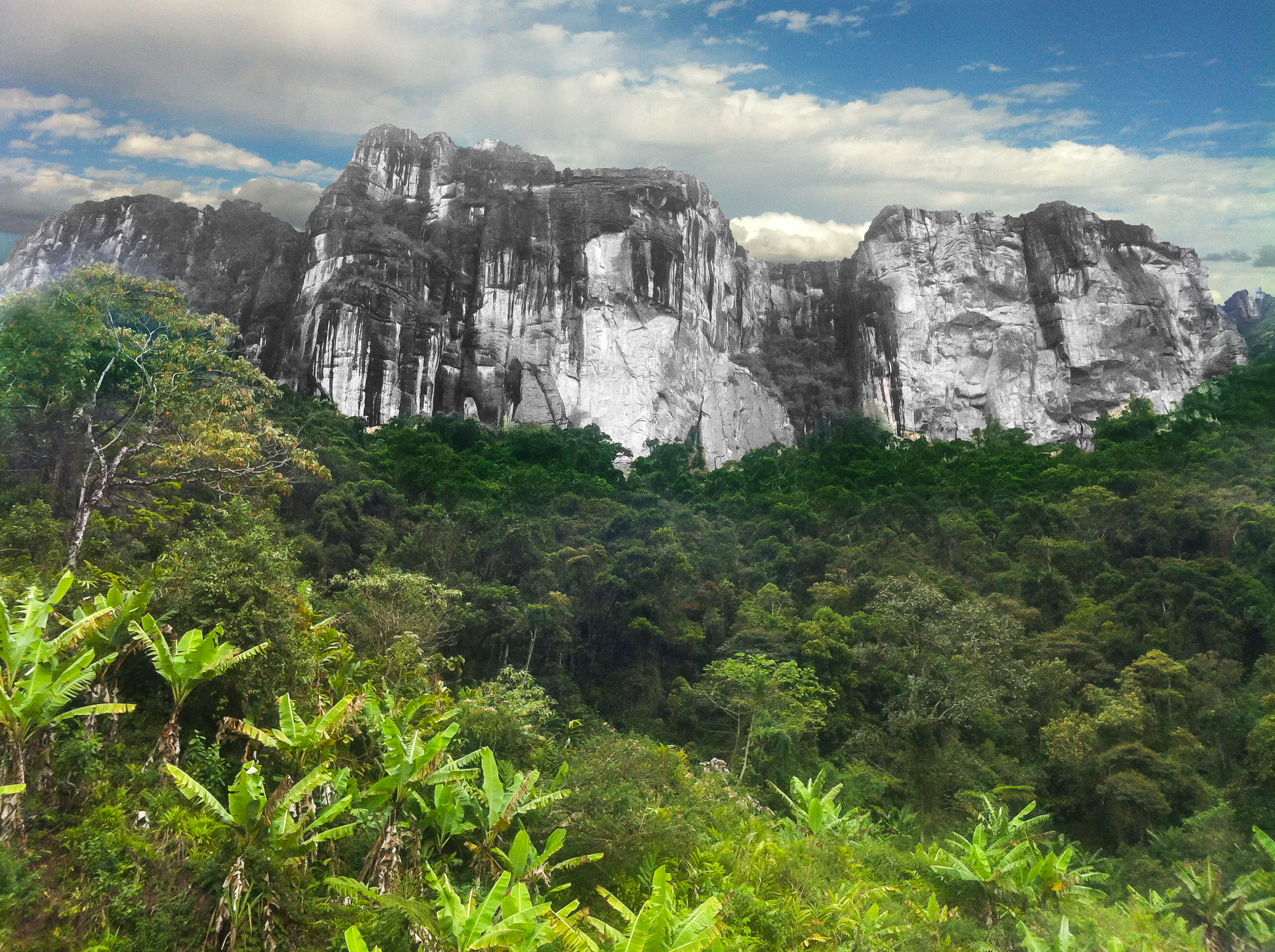
Andringitra National Park

Moist montane forest occurs between 600–800 and 1300 meters elevation, and occasionally as high as 1800 m in sheltered locales. The mature tree canopy is generally closed, and 20 to 25 meters high. Trees are typically evergreen, and species of Tambourissa, Pterophylla, Symphonia, Dombeya, Dilobeia, Dalbergia, Canarium, Diospyros, Eugenia, Protorhus, Grewia, Brachylaena, Astropanax, Polyscias, and Vernonia are most common. The conifer Podocarpus madagascariensis is also present. Trees of the genus Ephippiandra are largely confined to moist montane forest and some higher-elevation plant communities. There is a plentiful understory of shrubs and herbaceous plants. Epiphytes grow in large numbers on the canopy trees, including mosses, lichens, ferns, orchids (particularly species of Bulbophyllum), and species of Medinilla, Kalanchoe, Rhipsalis, and Peperomia.

Sclerophyllous montane forest is low sclerophyllous (hard-leaved) forests and open-canopied woodlands from 1300 to 2000 meters elevation, dominated by small-leaved trees. The canopy is generally no higher than 10 to 13 meters, and can resemble a thicket. Common canopy trees include Dicoryphe viticoides, Tina isoneura, Razafimandimbisonia minor, and Baronia taratana. Gymnosperms, including species of Podocarpus, and bamboo can form pure stands. The trees and the ground are covered in mosses and lichens.

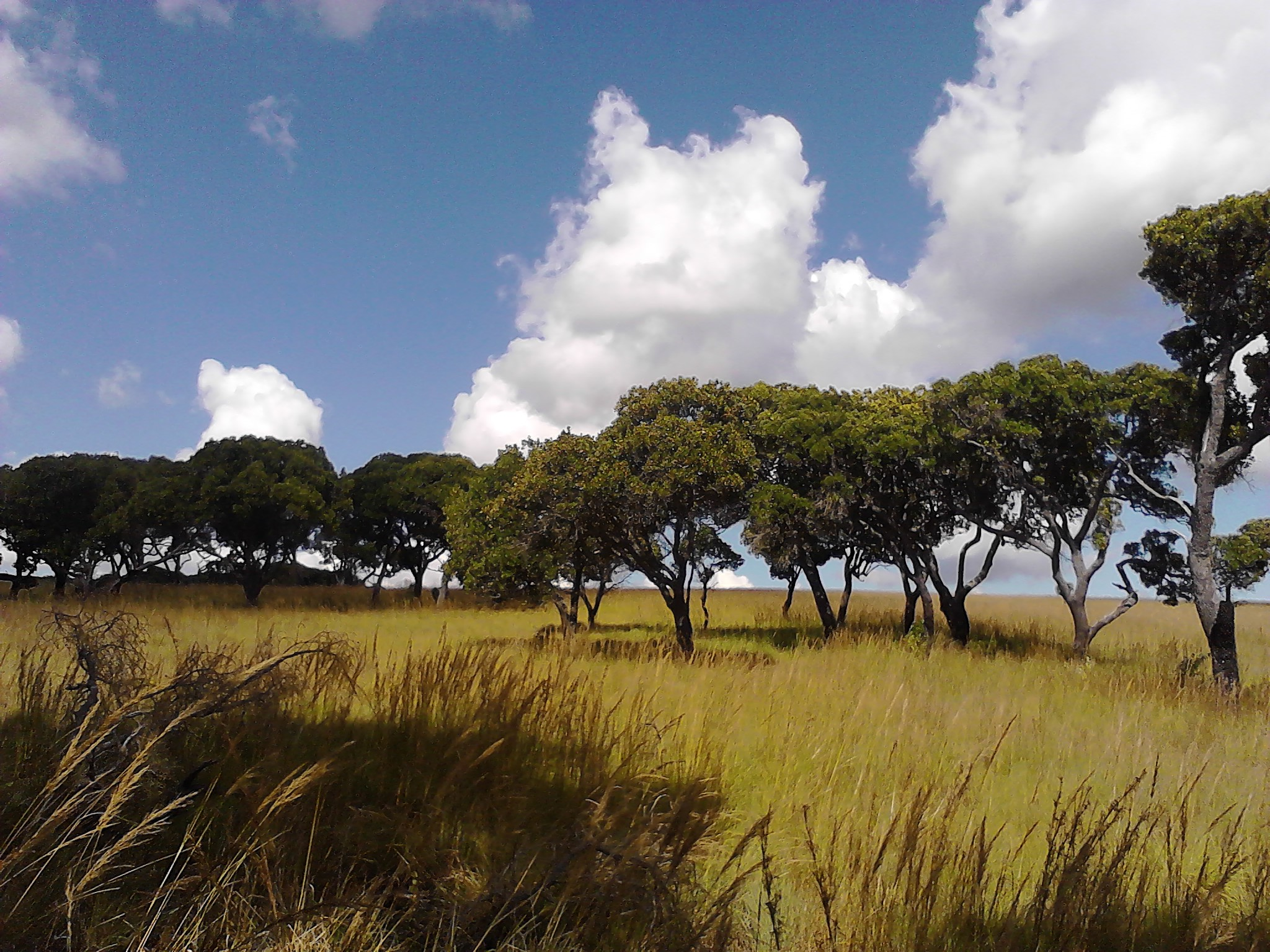
Tapia forest in the Itremo Massif

Tapia forest is found on the drier western slopes, which are in the rain shadow of the central uplands, between 600 and 1,600 meters elevation. Tapia (Uapaca bojeri) is a characteristic canopy tree, together with Leptolaena pauciflora, L. bojerana, and Sarcolaena oblongifolia. The trees have gnarled branches and small leaves, forming a mostly closed canopy 10 to 12 meters high which provides light shade on the forest floor. Other trees include Asteropeia densiflora, Agarista salicifolia, Pterophylla spp., Dodonaea madagascariensis, Faurea forficuliflora, Brachylaena microphylla, Dicoma incana, Baronia taratana, Abrahamia buxifolia, Neocussonia bojeri, Alberta spp., and Enterospermum spp. The understory is typically shrubs, including species of Erica, Vaccinium, Asteraceae (Senecio, Vernonia, Psiadia, Conyza, and Helichrysum), Rubiaceae, and Leguminosae. Tapia is fire-resistant, and where fires have been frequently set they form open woodlands or savannas with a grassy understory.

Rupicolous shrubland grows on rock outcrops and sandstone and granite inselbergs. Vegetation grows in crevices and on thin mats of coarse soil, and is often sparse and rarely more than two meters high. Common plants include the sedge Coleochloa setifera, the shrub Myrothamnus moschata, and species of Euphorbia. The shrublands are home to many endemic species including succulents in the genera Aloe, Kalanchoe, and Pachypodium. Revivescent plants, which periodically dry out and then revive when rains return, include the moss-like Selaginella echinata and the ferns Pellaea, Actiniopteris, and Notholaena.

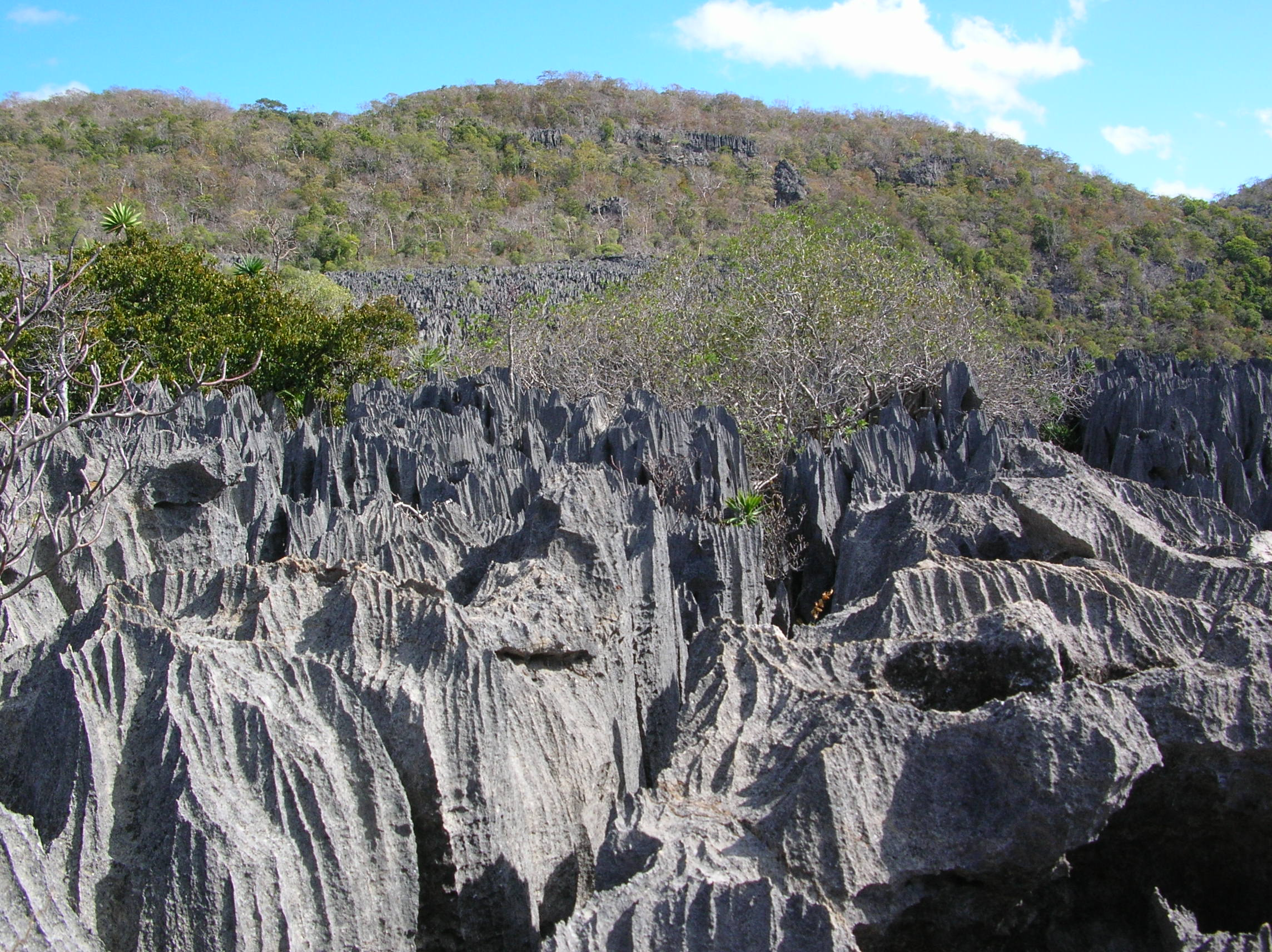
Ankarana Plateau, showing tsingy

Sambirano forests. The Sambirano region, also known as the Sambirano Domain, is a coastal region of northwestern Madagascar, lying west of the Tsaratanana and Manongarivo massifs. The region has higher rainfall than the rest of the west coast, and is home to distinctive forests. The Sambirano forests are predominantly evergreen, with some deciduous species characteristic of the dry forests to the north and south, which form a mature canopy 25 to 30 meters high. The Sambirano forests are home to several endemic species of plants and animals. Lowland primary forest has been reduced to small patches.

Secondary grasslands cover broad areas of the highlands. They are typically species–poor. 'Tanety' grasslands are low, sparse grasslands between 1,200 and 1,500 meters elevation, where Aristida rufescens is the characteristic species. 'Tampoketsa' grasslands cover the plateaus north and northeast of Antananarivo, between 1,600 and 1,900 meters elevation. The Madagascar endemic grass Loudetia simplex subsp. stipoides is predominant, interspersed with small patches of remnant forest. Low grasslands have also replaced most of the former tapia forests on the western slopes, between 800 and 1,600 meters elevation.

Above 2000 meters the sclerophyll forests transition to the high-elevation ericoid thickets, which are considered a distinct subalpine ecoregion.

== Fauna ==
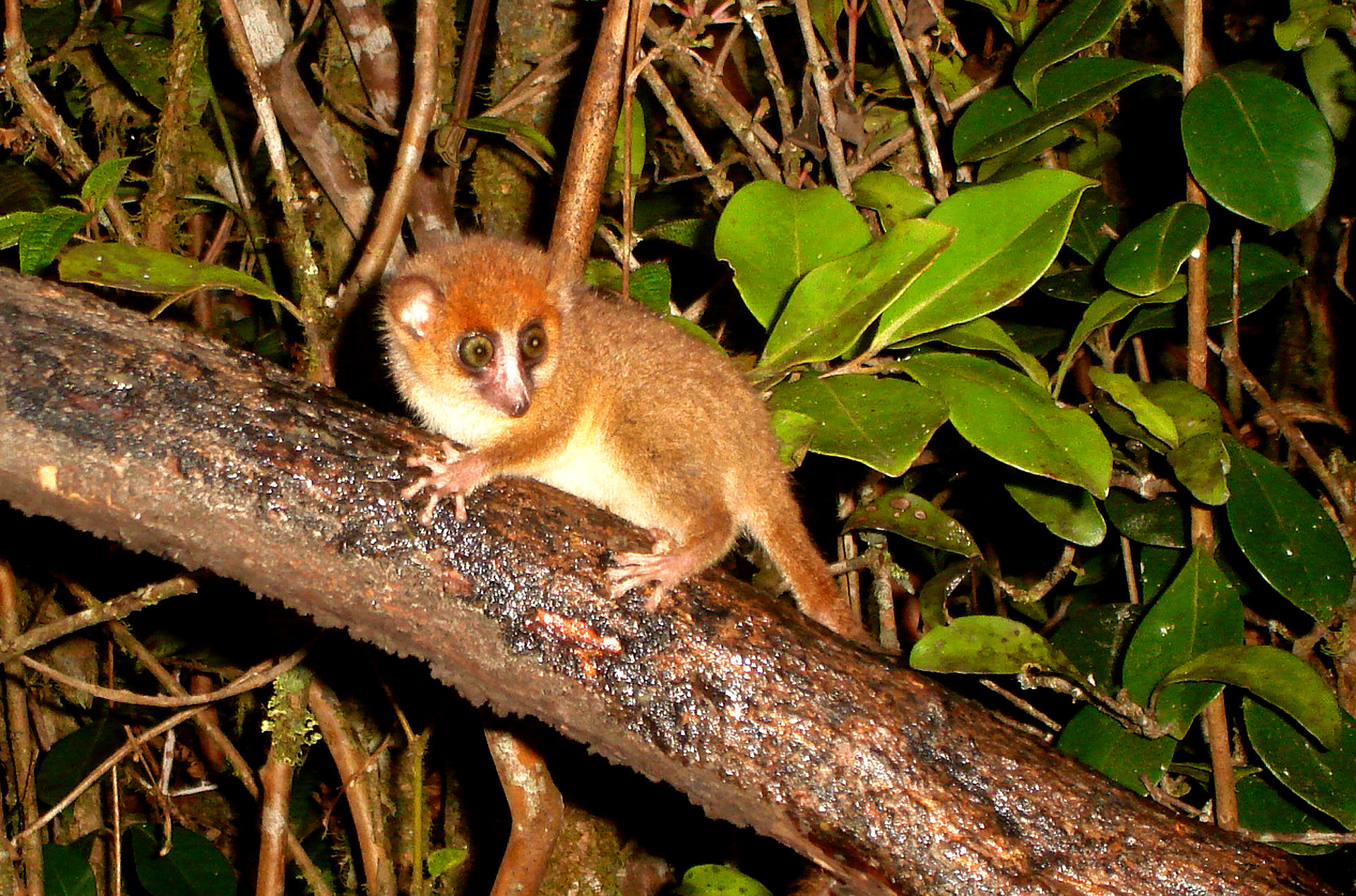
Brown mouse lemur at Ranomafana National Park

Endemic species include a number of birds, reptiles and mammals including the Alaotra gentle lemur (Hapalemur alaotrensis) and a number of shrews, tenrecs, and rodents. The subhumid forests were formerly home to the island's distinct megafauna, including giant lemurs, some of them larger than modern gorillas, the elephant birds (Aepyornithidae), and giant tortoises.

The Sambirano mouse lemur (Microcebus sambiranensis), Sambirano woolly lemur (Avahi unicolor), and Sambirano fork-marked lemur (Phaner parienti) are endemic to the Sambirano region.

The ecoregion is home to several endemic and limited-range species of birds. The rufous-headed ground roller (Atelornis crossleyi), grey-crowned tetraka (Xanthomixis cinereiceps) and forest rock thrush (Monticola sharpei) are largely endemic to the ecoregion. The yellow-bellied sunbird-asity (Neodrepanis hypoxantha), Madagascar yellowbrow (Crossleyia xanthophrys), and cryptic warbler (Cryptosylvicola randrianasoloi) are native to the subhumid forests and to the higher-elevation ericoid thickets. The Madagascar serpent eagle (Eutriorchis astur), short-legged ground roller (Brachypteracias leptosomus), Madagascar red owl (Tyto soumagnei), and Pollen's vanga (Xenopirostris polleni) live in both the subhumid forests and the lowland moist forests. The brown emu-tail (Bradypterus brunneus) lives in the lowland and subhumid forests and the ericoid thickets.

Lake Alaotra and its wetlands were once home to two endemic water birds, the Madagascar pochard (Aythya innotata) and Alaotra grebe (Tachybaptus rufolavatus). Both have disappeared from the lake. The Alaotra grebe is thought extinct, and the Madagascar pochard was thought extinct until a small population was sighted at Lake Matsaborimena.

Two dry forest species, Coquerel's coua (Coua coquereli) and Schlegel's asity (Philepitta schlegeli) also inhabit the humid forests of Sambirano.

== Threats and conservation ==
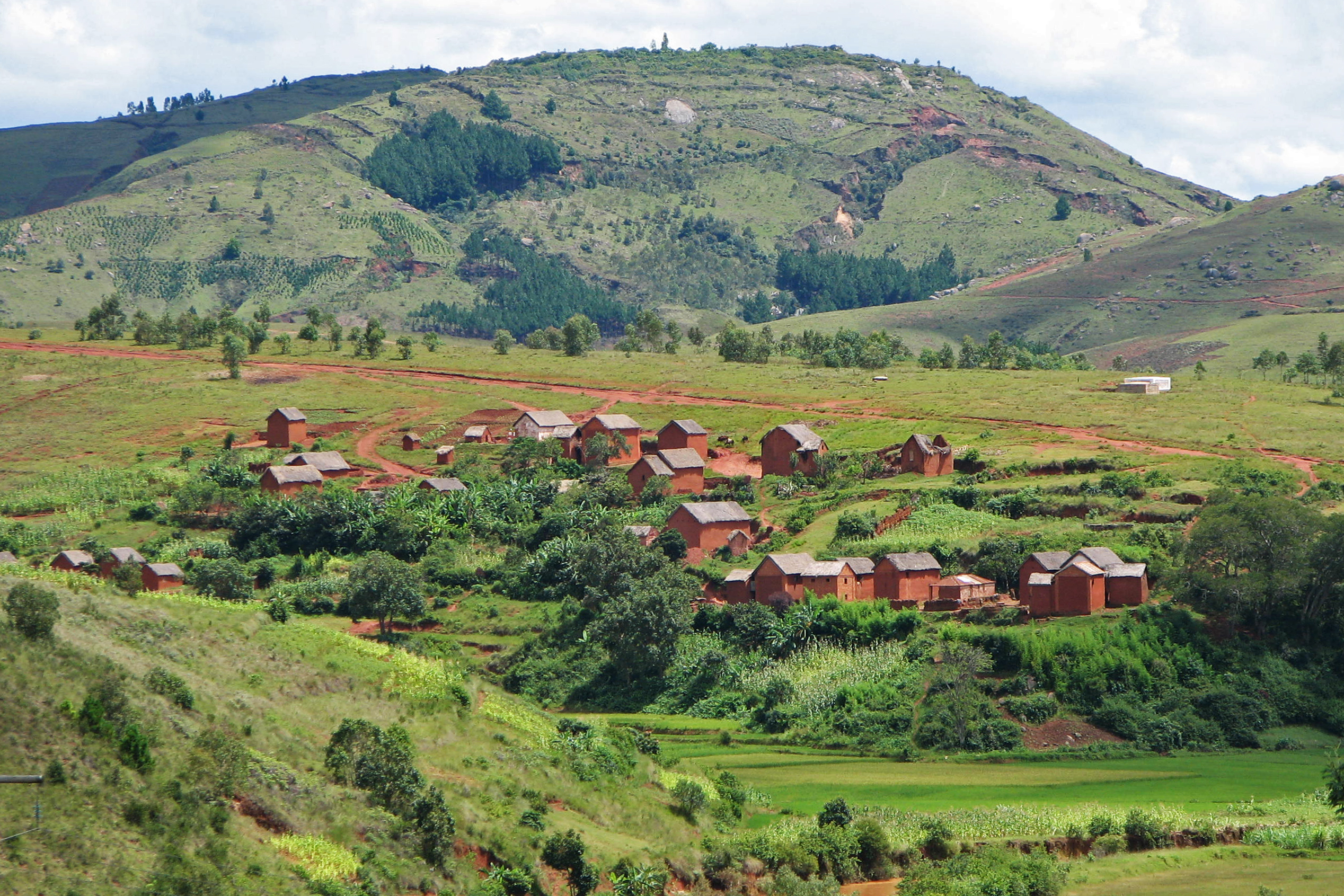
Madagascar lost 44% of its original forest between 1953 and 2014.

The central highlands are the most densely populated region of Madagascar, and includes the country's capital and largest city, Antananarivo. The highlands' population is growing.

Madagascar's high plateau forests have been altered by humans in most places. There has been extensive slash-and-burn activity by native peoples in the central highlands, eliminating most forest. Other impacts include land clearing for agriculture, overexploitation, introduced species, and pollution.

7.68% of the ecoregion is in protected areas. Protected areas include:

- Marojejy National Park
- Isalo National Park
- Ranomafana National Park
- Andohahela National Park
- Andringitra National Park
- Lokobe National Park
- Montagne d'Ambre National Park
- Befotaka Midongy National Park
- Tsaratanana Strict Nature Reserve
- Ambatovaky Special Reserve
- Ambohijanahary Special Reserve
- Ambohitantely Special Reserve
- Analamerana Special Reserve
- Anjanaharibe sud Special Reserve
- Ankarana Special Reserve
- Ivohibe Special Reserve
- Kalambatrika Special Reserve
- Manongarivo Special Reserve
- Tampoketsa Analamaitso Special Reserve

== See also ==
- Ecoregions of Madagascar
