= List of Eulophia species =

Eulophia is a genus of orchids that is distributed throughout the tropics and subtropics.

As of August 2026, Plants of the World Online accepts the following 284 species and two hybrids:

== A-B ==
- Eulophia abyssinica Rchb.f.
- Eulophia aculeata (L.f.) Spreng.
- Eulophia acutilabra Summerh.
- Eulophia adenoglossa (Lindl.) Rchb.f.
- Eulophia albobrunnea Kraenzl.
- Eulophia aloifolia Welw. ex Rchb.f.
- Eulophia alta (L.) Fawc. & Rendle
- Eulophia amblyosepala (Schltr.) Butzin
- Eulophia anceps S.S.Ying
- Eulophia andamanensis Rchb.f.
- Eulophia angolensis (Rchb.f.) Summerh.
- Eulophia angornensis (Rchb.f.) P.J.Cribb
- Eulophia angustilabris Seidenf.
- Eulophia antunesii Rolfe
- Eulophia arenicola Schltr.
- Eulophia attenuata (Griff.) M.W.Chase, Kumar & Schuit.
- Eulophia aurantiaca Rolfe
- Eulophia bamendensis (Szlach.) R.Kr.Singh & Sanjeet Kumar
- Eulophia barbata (Thunb.) Spreng.
- Eulophia barteri Summerh.
- Eulophia bicallosa (D.Don) P.F.Hunt & Summerh.
- Eulophia biloba Schltr.
- Eulophia bisaccata Kraenzl.
- Eulophia bolusii (Rolfe) M.W.Chase & Schuit.
- Eulophia borbonica Bosser
- Eulophia borneensis Ridl.
- Eulophia bosseriana M.W.Chase & Schuit.
- Eulophia bouliawongo (Rchb.f.) J.Raynal
- Eulophia brachycentra Hayata
- Eulophia bracteosa Lindl.
- Eulophia brenanii P.J.Cribb & la Croix
- Eulophia buettneri (Kraenzl.) Summerh.
- Eulophia × burundiensis Arbonn. & Geerinck

== C-E ==
- Eulophia calantha Schltr.
- Eulophia calanthoides Schltr.
- Eulophia callichroma Rchb.f.
- Eulophia campbellii Prain
- Eulophia capuroniana (Bosser & Morat) M.W.Chase & Schuit.
- Eulophia caricifolia (Rchb.f.) Summerh.
- Eulophia carsonii Rolfe
- Eulophia chaunanthe Seidenf.
- Eulophia chilangensis Summerh.
- Eulophia chlorantha Schltr.
- Eulophia chlorotica Kraenzl.
- Eulophia chrysoglossoides Schltr.
- Eulophia citrina (Andrews) Ormerod & Kurzweil
- Eulophia clandestina (Börge Pett.) Bytebier
- Eulophia clitellifera (Rchb.f.) Bolus
- Eulophia cochlearis Lindl.
- Eulophia coddii A.V.Hall
- Eulophia coeloglossa Schltr.
- Eulophia cooperi Rchb.f.
- Eulophia corymbifera J.M.H.Shaw
- Eulophia corymbosa Schltr.
- Eulophia coutreziana Geerinck
- Eulophia cristata (Afzel. ex Sw.) Steud.
- Eulophia cristatofimbriata (Szlach.) R.Kr.Singh & Sanjeet Kumar
- Eulophia cucullata (Afzel. ex Sw.) Steud.
- Eulophia dabia (D.Don) Hochr.
- Eulophia dactylifera P.J.Cribb
- Eulophia dahliana Kraenzl.
- Eulophia dentata Ames
- Eulophia dichroma Rolfe
- Eulophia diffusiflora M.W.Chase, Kumar & Schuit.
- Eulophia distans (Summerh.) ined.
- Eulophia divergens Fritsch
- Eulophia dufossei Guillaumin
- Eulophia ecristata (Fernald) Ames
- Eulophia edwardii Bytebier
- Eulophia elegans Schltr.
- Eulophia elisabethae (Linden & Rolfe) M.W.Chase & Schuit.
- Eulophia ensata Lindl.
- Eulophia ensiformis (Lindl.) comb. ined.
- Eulophia ephippium (Rchb.f.) Butzin
- Eulophia epidendraea (J.Koenig ex Retz.) C.E.C.Fisch.
- Eulophia epiphanoides Schltr.
- Eulophia epiphytica P.J.Cribb, Du Puy & Bosser
- Eulophia ericophila (Bosser) M.W.Chase & Schuit.
- Eulophia euantha Schltr.
- Eulophia euglossa (Rchb.f.) Rchb.f. ex Bateman
- Eulophia eulophioides (Schltr.) M.W.Chase, Kumar & Schuit.
- Eulophia eustachya (Rchb.f.) Geerinck
- Eulophia exigua M.W.Chase, Kumar & Schuit.
- Eulophia explanata Lindl.
- Eulophia eylesii Summerh.

== F-L ==
- Eulophia falcatiloba Szlach. & Olszewski
- Eulophia falcigera (Rchb.f.) M.W.Chase, Kumar & Schuit.
- Eulophia fernandeziana Geerinck
- Eulophia filifolia Bosser & Morat
- Eulophia flabellata (Thouars) M.W.Chase, Kumar & Schuit.
- Eulophia flava (Lindl.) Hook.f.
- Eulophia flavopurpurea (Rchb.f.) Rolfe
- Eulophia foliosa (Lindl.) Bolus
- Eulophia friderici (Rchb.f.) A.V.Hall
- Eulophia galbana Ridl.
- Eulophia galeoloides Kraenzl.
- Eulophia gastrodioides Schltr.
- Eulophia gonychila Schltr.
- Eulophia gracilis Lindl.
- Eulophia graminea Lindl.
- Eulophia grandidieri H.Perrier
- Eulophia granitica (Rchb.f.) Cufod.
- Eulophia guineensis Lindl.
- Eulophia herbacea Lindl.
- Eulophia hereroensis Schltr.
- Eulophia hermansiana M.W.Chase & Schuit.
- Eulophia hians Spreng.
- Eulophia hologlossa Schltr.
- Eulophia holubii Rolfe
- Eulophia horsfallii (Bateman) Summerh.
- Eulophia huttonii Rolfe
- Eulophia ibityensis Schltr.
- Eulophia inyangensis Summerh.
- Eulophia javanica J.J.Sm.
- Eulophia juncifolia Summerh.
- Eulophia kamarupa Sud.Chowdhury
- Eulophia katangensis (De Wild.) De Wild.
- Eulophia kyimbilae Schltr.
- Eulophia lagaligo Metusala
- Eulophia lamellata Lindl.
- Eulophia laotica (Guillaumin) M.W.Chase, Kumar & Schuit.
- Eulophia latilabris Summerh.
- Eulophia leachii Greatrex ex A.V.Hall
- Eulophia lejolyana Geerinck
- Eulophia lenbrassii Ormerod
- Eulophia leonensis Rolfe
- Eulophia leontoglossa Rchb.f.
- Eulophia letouzeyana Geerinck
- Eulophia lisowskii Szlach.
- Eulophia litoralis Schltr.
- Eulophia livingstoneana (Rchb.f.) Summerh.
- Eulophia longisepala Rendle

== M-O ==
- Eulophia macaulayae Summerh.
- Eulophia mackinnonii Duthie
- Eulophia macowanii Rolfe
- Eulophia macra Ridl.
- Eulophia macrantha Rolfe
- Eulophia macrobulbon (C.S.P.Parish & Rchb.f.) Hook.f.
- Eulophia magnicristata Szlach. & Olszewski
- Eulophia malangana (Rchb.f.) Summerh.
- Eulophia mangenotiana Bosser & Veyret
- Eulophia mannii (Rchb.f.) Hook.f.
- Eulophia massokoensis Schltr.
- Eulophia mechowii (Rchb.f.) T.Durand & Schinz
- Eulophia megistophylla Rchb.f.
- Eulophia meleagris Rchb.f.
- Eulophia micrantha Lindl.
- Eulophia milnei Rchb.f.
- Eulophia monantha W.W.Sm.
- Eulophia monile Rchb.f.
- Eulophia monotropis Schltr.
- Eulophia monticola Rolfe
- Eulophia montis-elgonis Summerh.
- Eulophia moratii N.Hallé
- Eulophia muktangkharensis S.Tobgay, Nidup & Dalström
- Eulophia mumbwaensis Summerh.
- Eulophia myanmarica Naive, K.Z.Hein & Kumar
- Eulophia nervosa H.Perrier
- Eulophia nicobarica N.P.Balakr. & N.G.Nair
- Eulophia norlindhii Summerh.
- Eulophia nuda Lindl.
- Eulophia nuttii Rolfe
- Eulophia nyasae Rendle
- Eulophia obscura P.J.Cribb
- Eulophia obstipa P.J.Cribb & la Croix
- Eulophia obtusa (Lindl.) Hook.f.
- Eulophia ochreata Lindl.
- Eulophia ochyrae Szlach. & Olszewski
- Eulophia odontoglossa Rchb.f.
- Eulophia orthoplectra (Rchb.f.) Summerh.
- Eulophia ovalis Lindl.

== P-R ==
- Eulophia palmicola H.Perrier
- Eulophia paradoxa Kraenzl.
- Eulophia pardalina (Rchb.f.) M.W.Chase & Schuit.
- Eulophia parilamellata Butzin
- Eulophia parviflora (Lindl.) A.V.Hall
- Eulophia parvilabris Lindl.
- Eulophia parvula (Rendle) Summerh.
- Eulophia pauciflora Guillaumin
- Eulophia penduliflora Kraenzl.
- Eulophia perrieri Schltr.
- Eulophia petersii (Rchb.f.) Rchb.f.
- Eulophia × pholelana H.Kurze & O.Kurze
- Eulophia picta (R.Br.) Ormerod
- Eulophia pileata Ridl.
- Eulophia plantaginea (Thouars) Rolfe ex Hochr.
- Eulophia platypetala Lindl.
- Eulophia pocsii Eb.Fisch., Killmann, J.-P.Lebel & Delep.
- Eulophia poiformis Szlach.
- Eulophia pottsii (P.M.Br. & DeAngelis) J.M.H.Shaw
- Eulophia pratensis Lindl.
- Eulophia promensis Lindl.
- Eulophia protearum Rchb.f.
- Eulophia pulchella (Ridl.) Ormerod & Kurzweil
- Eulophia pyrophila (Rchb.f.) Summerh.
- Eulophia ramifera Summerh.
- Eulophia ramosa Ridl.
- Eulophia rara Schltr.
- Eulophia recurva (Roxb.) M.W.Chase, Kumar & Schuit.
- Eulophia renschiana (Rchb.f.) T.Durand & Schinz
- Eulophia reticulata Ridl.
- Eulophia rhodesiaca Schltr.
- Eulophia richardsiae P.J.Cribb & la Croix
- Eulophia roempleriana (Rchb.f.) M.W.Chase & Schuit.
- Eulophia rolfeana Kraenzl.
- Eulophia rutenbergiana Kraenzl.
- Eulophia ruwenzoriensis Rendle

== S-Z ==
- Eulophia sabulosa Schltr.
- Eulophia santapaui Panigrahi & Kataki
- Eulophia saxicola P.J.Cribb & G.Will.
- Eulophia schaijesii Geerinck
- Eulophia schweinfurthii Kraenzl.
- Eulophia segawae Fukuy.
- Eulophia seleensis (De Wild.) Butzin
- Eulophia siamensis Rolfe ex Downie
- Eulophia sooi Chun & Tang ex S.C.Chen
- Eulophia sordida Kraenzl.
- Eulophia speciosa (R.Br.) Bolus
- Eulophia splendida (Koop. & P.J.Cribb) M.W.Chase & Schuit.
- Eulophia stachyodes Rchb.f.
- Eulophia stenopetala Lindl.
- Eulophia stenoplectra Summerh.
- Eulophia streptopetala Lindl.
- Eulophia stricta Rolfe
- Eulophia subsaprophytica Schltr.
- Eulophia subulata Rendle
- Eulophia suzannae Geerinck
- Eulophia sylviae Geerinck
- Eulophia tabularis (L.f.) Bolus
- Eulophia taitensis Pfennig & P.J.Cribb
- Eulophia taiwanensis Hayata
- Eulophia tanganyikensis Rolfe
- Eulophia tenella Rchb.f.
- Eulophia thollonii Szlach. & Olszewski
- Eulophia thomsonii Rolfe
- Eulophia tisserantii Szlach. & Olszewski
- Eulophia tricristata Schltr.
- Eulophia trilamellata De Wild.
- Eulophia tristis (L.f.) Spreng.
- Eulophia tuberculata Bolus
- Eulophia ukingensis Schltr.
- Eulophia ustulata (Bolus) Bolus
- Eulophia venosa (F.Muell.) Rchb.f. ex Benth.
- Eulophia venulosa Rchb.f.
- Eulophia vinosa McMurtry & G.McDonald
- Eulophia walleri (Rchb.f.) Kraenzl.
- Eulophia welwitschii (Rchb.f.) Rolfe
- Eulophia wendlandiana Kraenzl.
- Eulophia zeyheriana Sond.
- Eulophia zollingeri (Rchb.f.) J.J.Sm.

== Transferred to Orthochilus ==
A molecular phylogenetic study published in 2014 suggested the genus Eulophia was paraphyletic unless a clade containing Orthochilus was recognized and 34 species and one subspecies were transferred to the resurrected genus Orthochilus, which included many Eulophia and all Pteroglossaspis taxa. As of December 2023, the transfer was not recognized by Plants of the World Online and other sources. The species transferred in the 2014 study are listed below, with their names in Eulophia.

- Orthochilus abyssinicus, syn. of Eulophia abyssinica
- Orthochilus aculeatus, syn. of Eulophia aculeata
- Orthochilus adenoglossus, syn. of Eulophia adenoglossa
- Orthochilus albobrunneus, syn. of Eulophia albobrunnea
- Orthochilus aurantiacus, syn. of Eulophia aurantiaca
- Orthochilus carsonii, syn. of Eulophia carsonii
- Orthochilus chloranthus, syn. of Eulophia chlorantha
- Orthochilus clandestinus, syn. of Eulophia clandestina
- Orthochilus corymbosus, syn. of Eulophia corymbosa
- Orthochilus distans, syn. of Eulophia distans
- Orthochilus ecristatus, syn. of Eulophia ecristata
- Orthochilus ensatus, syn. of Eulophia ensata
- Orthochilus euanthus, syn. of Eulophia euantha
- Orthochilus eustachyus, syn. of Eulophia eustachya
- Orthochilus foliosus, syn. of Eulophia foliosa
- Orthochilus holubii, syn. of Eulophia holubii
- Orthochilus leontoglossus, syn. of Eulophia leontoglossa
- Orthochilus litoralis, syn. of Eulophia litoralis
- Orthochilus mechowii, syn. of Eulophia mechowii
- Orthochilus milnei, syn. of Eulophia milnei
- Orthochilus montis-elgonis, syn. of Eulophia montis-elgonis
- Orthochilus nuttii, syn. of Eulophia nuttii
- Orthochilus odontoglossus, syn. of Eulophia odontoglossa
- Orthochilus pottsii, syn. of Pteroglossaspis pittsii
- Orthochilus rarus, syn. of Eulophia rara
- Orthochilus rutenbergianus, syn. of Eulophia rutenbergiana
- Orthochilus ruwenzoriensis, syn. of Eulophia ruwenzoriensis
- Orthochilus subulatus, syn. of Eulophia subulata
- Orthochilus tabularis, syn. of Eulophia tabularis
- Orthochilus thomsonii, syn. of Eulophia thomsonii
- Orthochilus trilamellatus, syn. of Eulophia trilamellata
- Orthochilus vinosus, syn. of Eulophia vinosa
- Orthochilus walleri, syn. of Eulophia walleri
- Orthochilus welwitschii, syn. of Eulophia welwitschii

== Transferred to Oeceoclades ==
Likewise, the following species have been transferred to Oeceoclades. As of August 2026, the transfer was not recognized by Plants of the World Online.

- Oeceoclades alismatophylla, syn. of Eulophia alismatophylla
- Oeceoclades ambongensis, syn. of Eulophia schlechteri
- Oeceoclades ambrensis, syn. of Eulophia ambrensis
- Oeceoclades analamerensis, syn. of Eulophia analamerensis
- Oeceoclades analavelensis, syn. of Eulophia analavelensis
- Oeceoclades antsingyensis, syn. of Eulophia antsingyensis
- Oeceoclades atrovirens, syn. of Eulophia atrovirens
- Oeceoclades aurea, syn. of Eulophia chrysea
- Oeceoclades beravensis, syn. of Eulophia beravensis
- Oeceoclades boinensis, syn. of Eulophia boinensis
- Oeceoclades calcarata, syn. of Eulophia calcarata
- Oeceoclades callmanderi, syn. of Eulophia callmanderi
- Oeceoclades cordylinophylla, syn. of Eulophia cordylinophylla
- Oeceoclades decaryana, syn. of Eulophia decaryana
- Oeceoclades flavescens, syn. of Eulophia flavescens
- Oeceoclades furcata, syn. of Eulophia furcata
- Oeceoclades gracillima, syn. of Eulophia roseovariegata
- Oeceoclades hebdingiana, syn. of Eulophia hebdingiana
- Oeceoclades humbertii, syn. of Eulophia humbertii
- Oeceoclades lanceata, syn. of Eulophia lanceata
- Oeceoclades latifolia, syn. of Eulophia latifolia
- Oeceoclades lonchophylla, syn. of Eulophia lonchophylla
- Oeceoclades lubbersiana, syn. of Eulophia lubbersiana
- Oeceoclades maculata, syn. of Eulophia maculata
- Oeceoclades pandurata, syn. of Eulophia pandurata
- Oeceoclades perrieri, syn. of Eulophia ambongensis
- Oeceoclades petiolata, syn. of Eulophia petiolata
- Oeceoclades peyrotii, syn. of Eulophia peyrotii
- Oeceoclades pulchra, syn. of Eulophia pulchra
- Oeceoclades quadriloba, syn. of Eulophia quadriloba
- Oeceoclades rauhii, syn. of Eulophia rauhii
- Oeceoclades saundersiana, syn. of Eulophia saundersiana
- Oeceoclades sclerophylla, syn. of Eulophia sclerophylla
- Oeceoclades seychellarum, syn. of Eulophia seychellarum
- Oeceoclades spathulifera, syn. of Eulophia spathulifera
- Oeceoclades ugandae, syn. of Eulophia ugandae
- Oeceoclades versicolor, syn. of Eulophia versicolor
- Oeceoclades zanzibarica, syn. of Eulophia zanzibarica
