= Oeceoclades lubbersiana =

Scientific classification
- Kingdom: Plantae
- Clade: Tracheophytes
- Clade: Angiosperms
- Clade: Monocots
- Order: Asparagales
- Family: Orchidaceae
- Subfamily: Epidendroideae
- Genus: Oeceoclades
- Species: O. lubbersiana

Binomial name
- Oeceoclades lubbersiana (De Wild. & Laurent) Garay & P.Taylor

Synonyms
- Eulophia lubbersiana De Wild. & Laurent; Eulophidium lubbersianum (De Wild. & Laurent) Summerh.

Species of orchid

Oeceoclades lubbersiana is a terrestrial orchid species in the genus Oeceoclades that is native to the Democratic Republic of the Congo and Uganda. It was first described by the Belgian botanists Émile Auguste Joseph De Wildeman and Émile Laurent in 1899 as Eulophia lubbersiana, then moved to the genus Eulophidium by V.S. Summerhayes in 1957 and again transferred to the genus Oeceoclades in 1976 by Leslie Andrew Garay and Peter Taylor. Garay and Taylor noted that this species is similar to O. atrovirens in vegetative morphology, but is better allied to O. latifolia and O. pandurata because all three possess a labellum that is wider than it is long. Oeceoclades lubbersiana was named in honor of Louis Lubbers, who was a botanist working at the Botanical Garden of Brussels.
