= Oeceoclades spathulifera =

Scientific classification
- Kingdom: Plantae
- Clade: Tracheophytes
- Clade: Angiosperms
- Clade: Monocots
- Order: Asparagales
- Family: Orchidaceae
- Subfamily: Epidendroideae
- Genus: Oeceoclades
- Species: O. spathulifera

Binomial name
- Oeceoclades spathulifera (H.Perrier) Garay & P.Taylor

Synonyms
- Eulophia spathulifera H.Perrier; Lissochilus spathulifer (H.Perrier) H.Perrier; Eulophidium spathuliferum (H.Perrier) Summerh.

Species of orchid

Oeceoclades spathulifera is a terrestrial orchid species in the genus Oeceoclades that is endemic to northern and western Madagascar. It was first described by the French botanist Joseph Marie Henry Alfred Perrier de la Bâthie in 1935 as Eulophia spathulifera. Perrier later transferred the species to the genus Lissochilus in 1941 and it was again moved to the genus Eulophidium by V.S. Summerhayes in 1957. It was last transferred to the genus Oeceoclades in 1976 by Leslie Andrew Garay and Peter Taylor when they resurrected and revised that genus. Oeceoclades spathulifera is related to O. calcarata and O. hebdingiana but it can be distinguished from those species by its long, spathulate (spoon-shaped) sepals and petals and the globose (almost spherical) spur.
