= Oeceoclades perrieri =

Scientific classification
- Kingdom: Plantae
- Clade: Tracheophytes
- Clade: Angiosperms
- Clade: Monocots
- Order: Asparagales
- Family: Orchidaceae
- Subfamily: Epidendroideae
- Genus: Oeceoclades
- Species: O. perrieri

Binomial name
- Oeceoclades perrieri (Schltr.) Garay & P.Taylor

Synonyms
- Eulophidium perrieri Schltr.; Eulophia ambongensis Schltr.; Lissochilus ambongensis (Schltr.) H.Perrier

Species of orchid

Oeceoclades perrieri is a terrestrial orchid species in the genus Oeceoclades that is native to Mozambique and northwestern Madagascar. It was first described by the German botanist Rudolf Schlechter in 1913 as Eulophia ambongensis. Schlechter had also described a separate species, Eulophidium ambongense in the same 1913 work. When Leslie Andrew Garay and Peter Taylor resurrected and revised the genus Oeceoclades in 1976, these two taxa caused a naming conflict, so they chose to use Eulophidium ambongense as the basionym for O. ambongensis and reduced Eulophia ambongensis to a synonym of O. perrieri, which was based on the basionym Eulophidium perrieri that Schlechter had also described later in 1925. Both Eulophidium perrieri and Eulophia ambongensis were conspecific, belonging to the same species, so Garay and Taylor were free to use the later name as the base for their new combination when transferring taxa to Oeceoclades. Garay and Taylor noted that this species is related to O. quadriloba, O. sclerophylla, and O. analavelensis but can be distinguished from them by its characteristic long strap-like leaves that taper to a point.
