= Oeceoclades latifolia =

Scientific classification
- Kingdom: Plantae
- Clade: Tracheophytes
- Clade: Angiosperms
- Clade: Monocots
- Order: Asparagales
- Family: Orchidaceae
- Subfamily: Epidendroideae
- Genus: Oeceoclades
- Species: O. latifolia

Binomial name
- Oeceoclades latifolia (Rolfe) Garay & P.Taylor

Synonyms
- Eulophia latifolia Rolfe; Eulophidium latifolium (Rolfe) Summerh.

Species of orchid

Oeceoclades latifolia is a terrestrial orchid species in the genus Oeceoclades that is endemic to São Tomé Island. It was first described by the British botanist Robert Allen Rolfe in 1891 as Eulophia latifolia, then moved to the genus Eulophidium by V.S. Summerhayes in 1957 and again moved to the genus Oeceoclades in 1976 by Leslie Andrew Garay and Peter Taylor. Garay and Taylor noted that O. latifolia is similar in vegetative morphology to O. atrovirens but the floral structure is more similar to O. ugandae. The lateral veins on the labellum are fringed with small hairs, a characteristic that is shared with O. pandurata, O. seychellarum, and O. lanceata.
