= Oeceoclades longebracteata =

Scientific classification
- Kingdom: Plantae
- Clade: Tracheophytes
- Clade: Angiosperms
- Clade: Monocots
- Order: Asparagales
- Family: Orchidaceae
- Subfamily: Epidendroideae
- Genus: Oeceoclades
- Species: O. longebracteata

Binomial name
- Oeceoclades longebracteata Bosser & Morat

Species of orchid

Oeceoclades longebracteata is a species of terrestrial orchid in the genus Oeceoclades that is endemic to southwestern and south-central Madagascar. It was first described by the French botanists Jean Marie Bosser and Philippe Morat in 2001. The type specimen was collected in 1970 by Jean Marie Bosser from dry forest undergrowth near Tsaramasao, 20 km (12 mi) south of Sakaraha. The specific epithet longebracteata refers to the long bracts found along the inflorescence.

== Description ==
The conical pseudobulbs are about 2 cm (0.79 in) high and heteroblastic (derived from a single internode). The narrow linear leaves are 30–45 mm (1.2–1.8 in) long by 3.5–5 mm (0.14–0.20 in) wide and are acute at the apex. There are one or two thick, fleshy leaves on each pseudobulb that are brownish green with darker green or purplish-brown markings. Inflorescences are 0.75–1 m (2.5–3.3 ft) long, of which only the terminal 30–40 cm (12–16 in) is where the flowers emerge. The inflorescence has a series of five to seven narrow, linear bracts, which are pale yellow stained with green spots. Higher up the inflorescence, there are 2.5–3 cm (0.98–1.18 in) floral bracts that are longer than the ovary. The inflorescence is a simple raceme that has about 20 to 25 flowers with green sepals and petals with purple veins.

Oeceoclades longebracteata is a terrestrial species found growing on gritty sand in clear undergrowth in deciduous forests. It is similar to O. decaryana in floral morphology, but is easily distinguished from that species by the very narrow leaves and the long, linear floral bracts.
