= Oeceoclades angustifolia =

Scientific classification
- Kingdom: Plantae
- Clade: Tracheophytes
- Clade: Angiosperms
- Clade: Monocots
- Order: Asparagales
- Family: Orchidaceae
- Subfamily: Epidendroideae
- Genus: Oeceoclades
- Species: O. angustifolia

Binomial name
- Oeceoclades angustifolia (Senghas) Garay & P.Taylor

Synonyms
- Eulophidium angustifolium Senghas; Eulophidium angustifolium subsp. diphyllum Senghas

Species of orchid

Oeceoclades angustifolia is a terrestrial orchid species in the genus Oeceoclades that is endemic to southwestern and northern Madagascar. It was first described by the German botanist Karlheinz Senghas in 1966 as Eulophidium angustifolium. When Leslie Andrew Garay and Peter Taylor revised the genus Oeceoclades in 1976, they transferred this species to the expanded Oeceoclades. The type specimen was collected by Werner Rauh near the town of Sakaraha and the Fiherenana River.

Garay and Taylor noted that this species is closely related to O. decaryana, but O. angustifolia can be distinguished by its petiolate leaves and a labellum with different proportions.
