= Oeceoclades flavescens =

Scientific classification
- Kingdom: Plantae
- Clade: Tracheophytes
- Clade: Angiosperms
- Clade: Monocots
- Order: Asparagales
- Family: Orchidaceae
- Subfamily: Epidendroideae
- Genus: Oeceoclades
- Species: O. flavescens

Binomial name
- Oeceoclades flavescens Bosser & Morat

Species of orchid

Oeceoclades flavescens is a terrestrial orchid species in the genus Oeceoclades that is endemic to northeastern Madagascar. It was first described by the French botanists Jean Marie Bosser and Philippe Morat in 2001. The type specimen was collected in 1954 from the wet undergrowth of a coastal forest near Maroantsetra; it is the only known collection of this species. The specific epithet flavescens refers to the pale yellow flowers.

== Description ==
The conical pseudobulbs are 1.5–3 centimetres (0.59–1.18 in) high and heteroblastic (derived from a single internode). The oblong to narrowly lanceolate leaves are 15–22 cm (5.9–8.7 in) long by 2–3 cm (0.79–1.18 in) wide, taper to a point, and have three to five primary longitudinal veins. There is a single papery leaf on each pseudobulb with a 10–12 cm (3.9–4.7 in) long petiole with a joint about 6 cm (2.4 in) below the leaf blade. Inflorescences are 40–45 cm (16–18 in) long, of which 30–32 cm (12–13 in) of that length is the peduncle. The inflorescence is a simple raceme with only 10 to 12 pale yellow flowers with purple streaks on the labellum. The sepals are 9–10 mm (0.35–0.39 in) long by 2–2.5 mm (0.079–0.098 in) wide and petals are 8–9 mm (0.31–0.35 in) long by 3 mm (0.12 in) wide. The four lobes of the labellum are rounded and the spur is forward-projecting.

Oeceoclades flavescens is similar to O. pulchra but it is very distinctive in the papery leaves and the morphology of the labellum.
