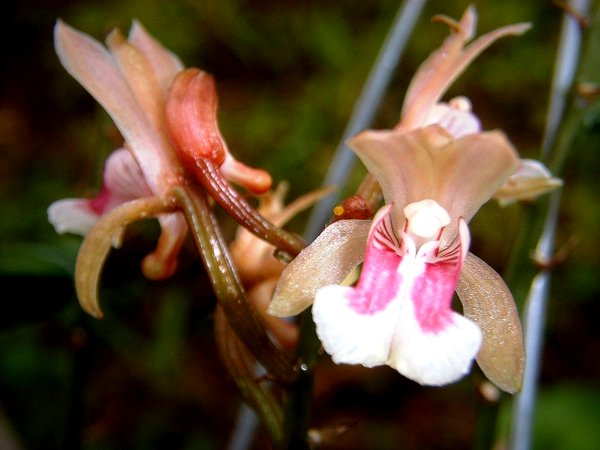
- Oeceoclades maculata

Scientific classification
- Kingdom: Plantae
- Clade: Tracheophytes
- Clade: Angiosperms
- Clade: Monocots
- Order: Asparagales
- Family: Orchidaceae
- Subfamily: Epidendroideae
- Tribe: Cymbidieae
- Subtribe: Eulophiinae
- Genus: Oeceoclades; Lindl.

Type species
- Oeceoclades maculata (Lindl.) Lindl.

Synonyms
- Eulophidium Pfitzer

= Oeceoclades =

Genus of orchids

Oeceoclades, collectively known as the monk orchids, is a genus of flowering plants from the orchid family, Orchidaceae. It is related to Eulophia and like that genus is mostly terrestrial in habit. A few species extend into very arid environments, unusual for an orchid.

The genus contains about 40 known species, most of which are narrow endemics to parts of Madagascar with some widespread across much of sub-Saharan Africa and the islands of the Indian Ocean. One species, O. maculata, has become naturalized in Mexico, South America, Central America, the West Indies and Florida. In Florida and several other places, O. maculata is considered an invasive weed.

The only consistent morphological character that does not show intermediate forms in either genus and can thus separate Oeceoclades from Eulophia is the presence of two fleshy ridges on the basal part of the labellum (the hypochile). The genus was resurrected by Leslie Andrew Garay and Peter Taylor in 1976 and since then has been affirmed as a monophyletic genus in molecular phylogenetic studies.

== Species ==
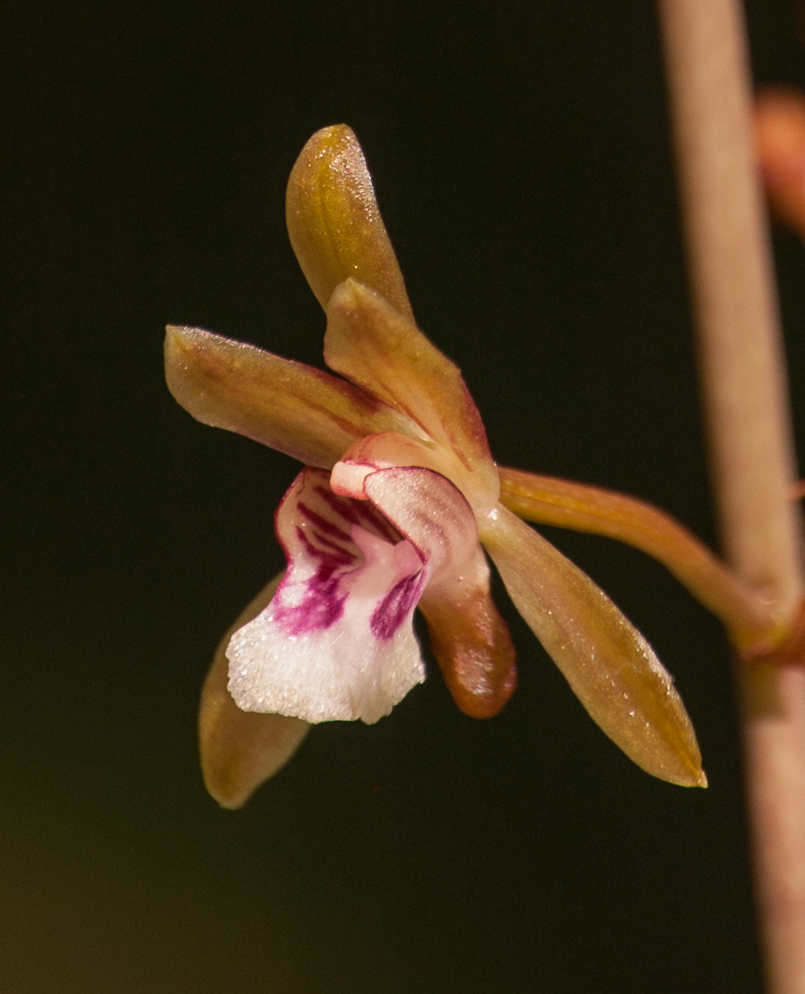
Oeceoclades gracillima flower

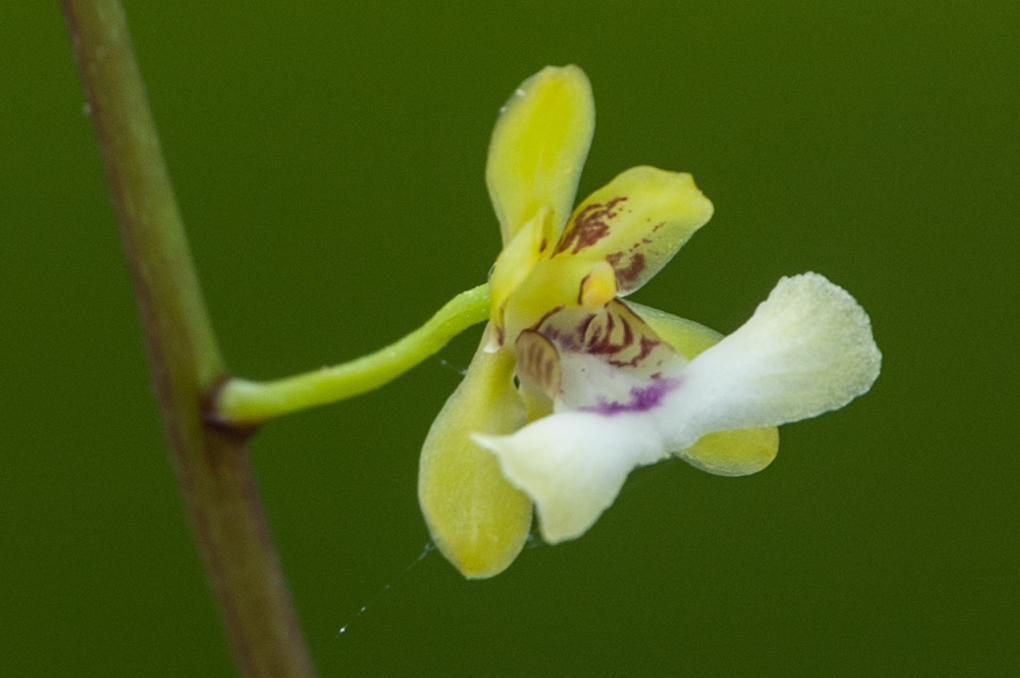
Oeceoclades lonchophylla flower

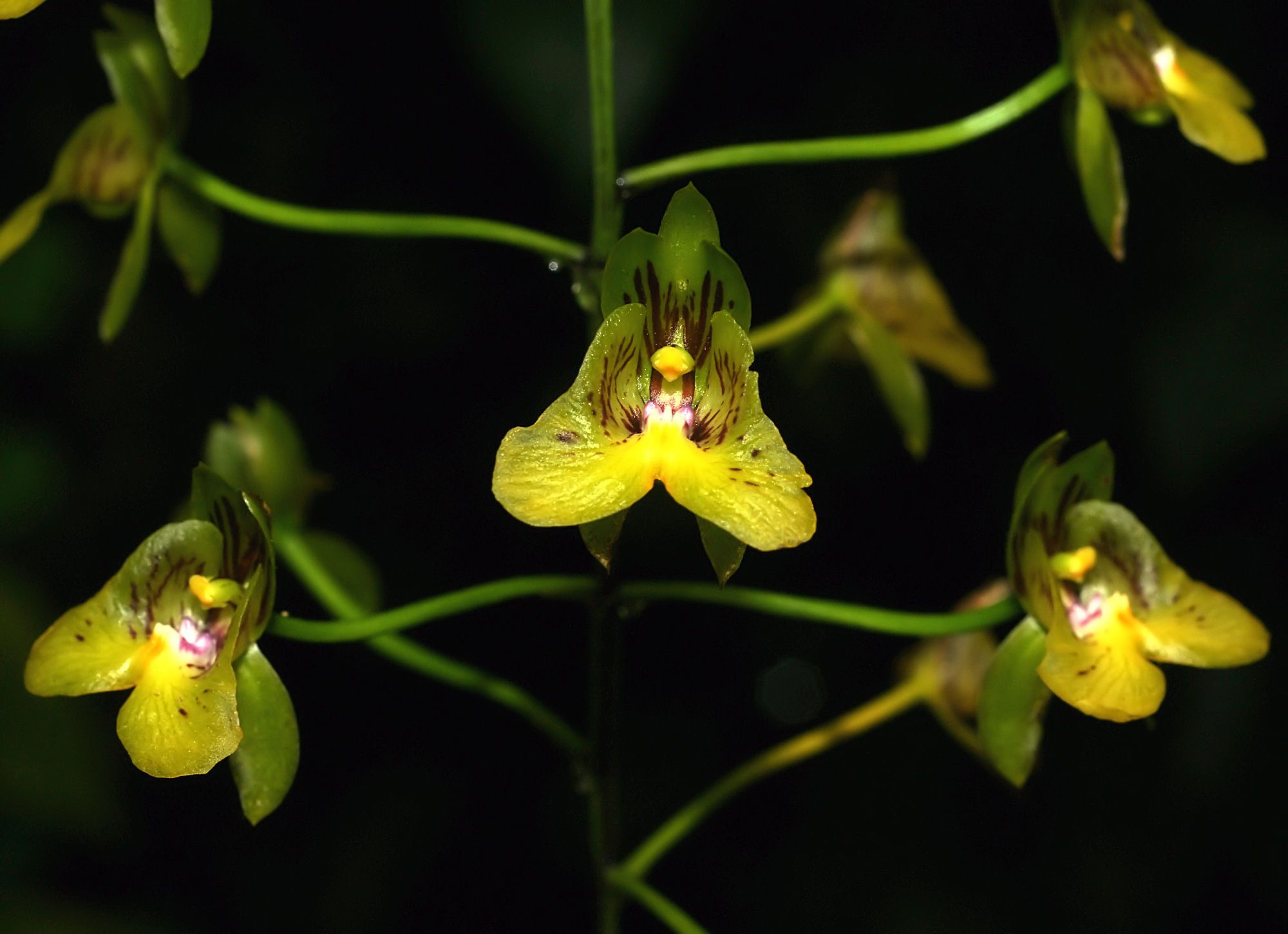
Oeceoclades pulchra inflorescence

Species accepted:

- Oeceoclades alismatophylla (Rchb.f.) Garay & P.Taylor
- Oeceoclades ambongensis (Schltr.) Garay & P.Taylor
- Oeceoclades ambrensis (H.Perrier) Bosser & Morat
- Oeceoclades analamerensis (H.Perrier) Garay & P.Taylor
- Oeceoclades analavelensis (H.Perrier) Garay & P.Taylor
- Oeceoclades angustifolia (Senghas) Garay & P.Taylor
- Oeceoclades antsingyensis G.Gerlach
- Oeceoclades atrovirens (Lindl.) Garay & P.Taylor
- Oeceoclades aurea Loubr.
- Oeceoclades beravensis (Rchb.f.) R.Bone & Buerki
- Oeceoclades boinensis (Schltr.) Garay & P.Taylor
- Oeceoclades calcarata (Schltr.) Garay & P.Taylor
- Oeceoclades callmanderi Bosser
- Oeceoclades cordylinophylla (Rchb.f.) Garay & P.Taylor
- Oeceoclades decaryana (H.Perrier) Garay & P.Taylor
- Oeceoclades flavescens Bosser & Morat
- Oeceoclades furcata Bosser & Morat
- Oeceoclades gracillima (Schltr.) Garay & P.Taylor
- Oeceoclades hebdingiana (Guillaumin) Garay & P.Taylor
- Oeceoclades humbertii (H.Perrier) Bosser & Morat
- Oeceoclades lanceata (H.Perrier) Garay & P.Taylor
- Oeceoclades latifolia (Rolfe) Garay & P.Taylor
- Oeceoclades lavergneae J.-B.Castillon
- Oeceoclades lonchophylla (Rchb.f.) Garay & P.Taylor
- Oeceoclades longebracteata Bosser & Morat
- Oeceoclades lubbersiana (De Wild. & Laurent) Garay & P.Taylor
- Oeceoclades maculata (Lindl.) Lindl
- Oeceoclades pandurata (Rolfe) Garay & P.Taylor
- Oeceoclades perrieri (Schltr.) Garay & P.Taylor
- Oeceoclades petiolata (Schltr.) Garay & P.Taylor
- Oeceoclades peyrotii Bosser & Morat
- Oeceoclades pulchra (Thouars) P.J.Cribb & M.A.Clem.
- Oeceoclades quadriloba (Schltr.) Garay & P.Taylor
- Oeceoclades rauhii (Senghas) Garay & P.Taylor
- Oeceoclades saundersiana (Rchb.f.) Garay & P.Taylor
- Oeceoclades sclerophylla (Rchb.f.) Garay & P.Taylor
- †Oeceoclades seychellarum (Rolfe ex Summerh.) Garay & P.Taylor
- Oeceoclades spathulifera (H.Perrier) Garay & P.Taylor
- Oeceoclades ugandae (Rolfe) Garay & P.Taylor
- Oeceoclades versicolor (Frapp. ex Cordem.) J.-B.Castillon
- Oeceoclades zanzibarica (Summerh.) Garay & P.Taylor

== See also ==
- List of Orchidaceae genera
