= Oeceoclades peyrotii =

Scientific classification
- Kingdom: Plantae
- Clade: Tracheophytes
- Clade: Angiosperms
- Clade: Monocots
- Order: Asparagales
- Family: Orchidaceae
- Subfamily: Epidendroideae
- Genus: Oeceoclades
- Species: O. peyrotii

Binomial name
- Oeceoclades peyrotii Bosser & Morat

Species of orchid

Oeceoclades peyrotii is a species of terrestrial orchid in the genus Oeceoclades that is endemic to southwestern Madagascar. It was first described by the French botanists Jean Marie Bosser and Philippe Morat in 2001. The type specimen was collected in 1974 by Bosser and Morat from the woods near Ankazoabo, but it has also been found 40 km (25 mi) south of Sakaraha, near Mahaboboka, and near Morombe. The specific epithet peyrotii was given to this species in honor of Dr. Jean-Pierre Peyrot whose observations and collections have led to a better understanding of Malagasy orchids.

== Description ==
The conical pseudobulbs are about 2–2.5 cm (0.79–0.98 in) high by 2 cm (0.79 in) wide and heteroblastic (derived from a single internode). Each pseudobulb has a single ovate-pointed, leathery leaf with slightly wavy margins. The leaves are 4–5 cm (1.6–2.0 in) long by 2–2.5 cm (0.79–0.98 in) wide at the widest point and have 10–11 mm (0.39–0.43 in) long petioles that are hinged 5–7 mm (0.20–0.28 in) from the top of the pseudobulb. The leaves are dark green on the upper surface and purplish on the underside, sometimes with darker stripes. The erect inflorescences are 20–45 cm (7.9–17.7 in) tall, of which only the terminal 10–25 cm (3.9–9.8 in) is a simple or compound raceme where the flowers emerge. The flowers are small, about 7–9 mm (0.28–0.35 in) in diameter.

Oeceoclades peyrotii is a terrestrial species found growing in deciduous forests of southwestern Madagascar, where it is known from only four locations. It is similar to other small-flowered species such as O. rauhii, O. analavelensis, and O. analamerensis but can be distinguished from those species by the differing characters of the labellum and spur and by the length of the petiole.
