= Oeceoclades zanzibarica =

Scientific classification
- Kingdom: Plantae
- Clade: Tracheophytes
- Clade: Angiosperms
- Clade: Monocots
- Order: Asparagales
- Family: Orchidaceae
- Subfamily: Epidendroideae
- Genus: Oeceoclades
- Species: O. zanzibarica

Binomial name
- Oeceoclades zanzibarica (Summerh.) Garay & P.Taylor

Synonyms
- Eulophidium zanzibaricum Summerh.

Species of orchid

Oeceoclades zanzibarica is a terrestrial orchid species in the genus Oeceoclades that is endemic to eastern Tanzania in the Zanzibar Archipelago. It was first described by the English botanist V.S. Summerhayes in 1927 as Eulophidium zanzibaricum and then later transferred to the genus Oeceoclades in 1976 when Leslie Andrew Garay and Peter Taylor resurrected and revised that genus. The lanceolate leaves, which gradually taper to a point, are unique to the genus and the floral morphology is most similar to O. alismatophylla. However, the two species differ in the shape of sepals and petals and in the proportions of the labellum.
