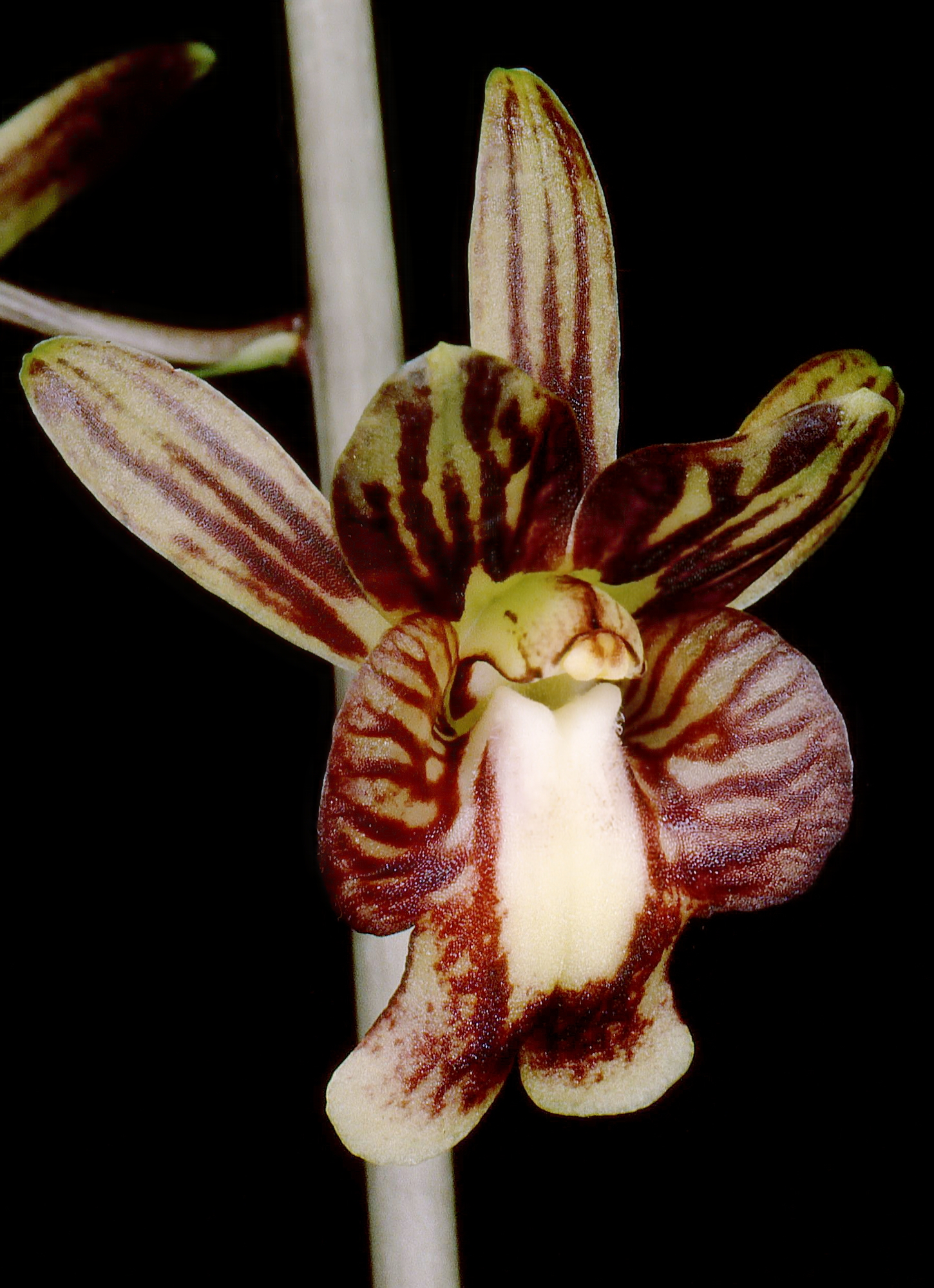
- Oeceoclades saundersiana

Scientific classification
- Kingdom: Plantae
- Clade: Tracheophytes
- Clade: Angiosperms
- Clade: Monocots
- Order: Asparagales
- Family: Orchidaceae
- Subfamily: Epidendroideae
- Genus: Oeceoclades
- Species: O. saundersiana

Binomial name
- Oeceoclades saundersiana (Rchb.f.) Garay & P.Taylor

Synonyms
- Eulophia saundersiana Rchb.f.; Graphorkis saundersiana (Rchb.f.) Kuntze; Eulophidium saundersianum (Rchb.f.) Summerh.; Lissochilus barombensis Kraenzl.; Eulophia bieleri De Wild.; Eulophia mildbraedii Kraenzl.

= Oeceoclades saundersiana =

Species of orchid

Oeceoclades saundersiana is a terrestrial orchid species in the genus Oeceoclades that is native to a large area in tropical Africa. It can be found in west tropical Africa (Benin, Ghana, Guinea, Ivory Coast, Liberia, Nigeria, and Sierra Leone), west-central tropical Africa (Central African Republic, Cameroon, Equatorial Guinea, Gabon, the Gulf of Guinea islands, Rwanda, and Democratic Republic of the Congo), northeast tropical Africa (Ethiopia), east tropical Africa (Kenya, Tanzania, and Uganda), and south tropical Africa (Angola and Zambia). It was first described by the German botanist Heinrich Gustav Reichenbach in 1866 as Eulophia saundersiana. It was later transferred to the genus Oeceoclades in 1976 by Leslie Andrew Garay and Peter Taylor. Garay and Taylor noted that O. saundersiana has a labellum with four lobes of equal size and the pseudobulb is long and cylindrical with two leaves.
