= Oeceoclades hebdingiana =

Scientific classification
- Kingdom: Plantae
- Clade: Tracheophytes
- Clade: Angiosperms
- Clade: Monocots
- Order: Asparagales
- Family: Orchidaceae
- Subfamily: Epidendroideae
- Genus: Oeceoclades
- Species: O. hebdingiana

Binomial name
- Oeceoclades hebdingiana (Guillaumin) Garay & P.Taylor

Synonyms
- Lissochilus hebdingianus Guillaumin

Species of orchid

Oeceoclades hebdingiana is a terrestrial orchid species in the genus Oeceoclades that is endemic to western Madagascar. It was first described by the French botanist André Guillaumin in 1964 as Lissochilus hebdingianus. It was then transferred to the genus Oeceoclades in 1976 by Leslie Andrew Garay and Peter Taylor. Garay and Taylor noted that this species is related to O. calcarata, but differs in the shape of the labellum. Oeceoclades calcarata also has a forward-projecting spur, while O. hebdingiana does not.
