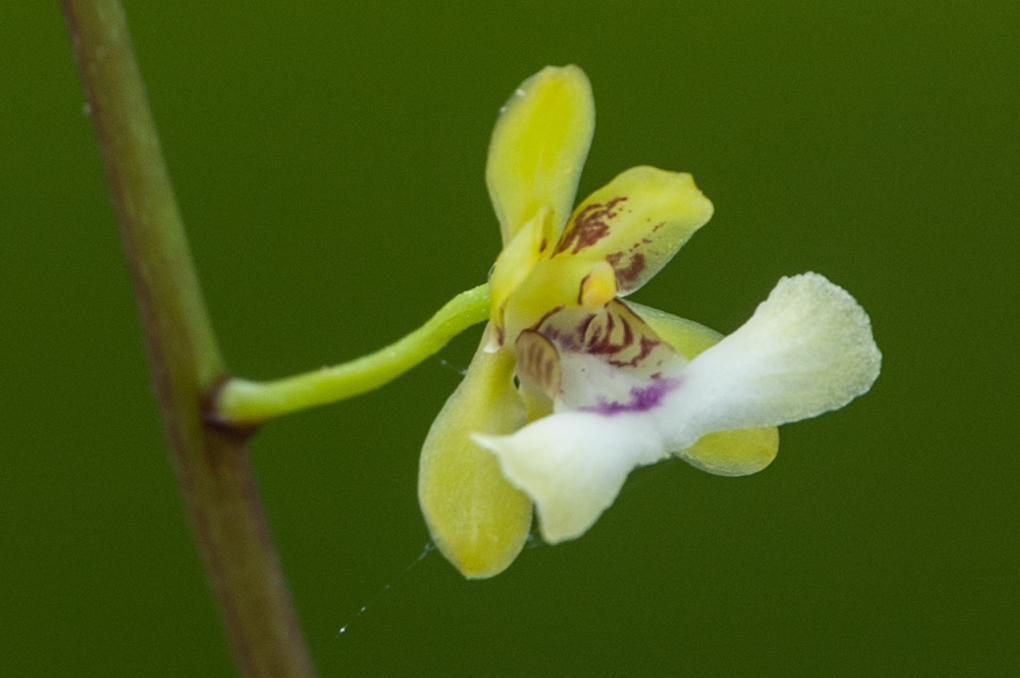

Scientific classification
- Kingdom: Plantae
- Clade: Tracheophytes
- Clade: Angiosperms
- Clade: Monocots
- Order: Asparagales
- Family: Orchidaceae
- Subfamily: Epidendroideae
- Genus: Oeceoclades
- Species: O. lonchophylla

Binomial name
- Oeceoclades lonchophylla (Rchb.f.) Garay & P.Taylor

Synonyms
- Eulophia lonchophylla Rchb.f.; Eulophidium lonchophyllum (Rchb.f.) Schltr.; Lissochilus lonchophyllus (Rchb.f.) H.Perrier; Eulophia tainioides Schltr.; Eulophia dissimilis R.A.Dyer; Eulophidium dissimile R.A.Dyer; Eulophidium tainioides (Schltr.) Summerh.

= Oeceoclades lonchophylla =

Species of orchid

Oeceoclades lonchophylla is a terrestrial orchid species in the genus Oeceoclades that is native to Tanzania, Mozambique, KwaZulu-Natal in South Africa, and Comoros. It was first described by the German botanist Heinrich Gustav Reichenbach in 1885 as Eulophia lonchophylla, then moved to the genus Eulophidium by Rudolf Schlechter in 1925 and to the genus Lissochilus by Joseph Marie Henry Alfred Perrier de la Bâthie in 1941. It was last transferred to the genus Oeceoclades in 1976 by Leslie Andrew Garay and Peter Taylor. Garay and Taylor also reduced the species Eulophia tainioides to a synonym of O. lonchophylla for lack of distinguishing characteristics that could separate the two species.
