= Oeceoclades ambrensis =

Scientific classification
- Kingdom: Plantae
- Clade: Tracheophytes
- Clade: Angiosperms
- Clade: Monocots
- Order: Asparagales
- Family: Orchidaceae
- Subfamily: Epidendroideae
- Genus: Oeceoclades
- Species: O. ambrensis

Binomial name
- Oeceoclades ambrensis (H.Perrier) Bosser & Morat

Synonyms
- Lissochilus ambrensis H.Perrier; Eulophia ambrensis (H.Perrier) Butzin

Species of orchid

Oeceoclades ambrensis is a terrestrial orchid species in the genus Oeceoclades that is endemic to northern Madagascar, where it grows in humid forests at altitudes of 1,000–1,100 metres (3,300–3,600 ft). It was first described by the French botanist Joseph Marie Henry Alfred Perrier de la Bâthie in 1951 as Lissochilus ambrensis and moved to the genus Eulophia in 1975 by Friedhelm Reinhold Butzin. It was last transferred to the genus Oeceoclades in 2001 by Jean Marie Bosser and Philippe Morat. The type specimen was collected in 1924 from montagne d'Ambre, now a part of Amber Mountain National Park. The pseudobulbs are fusiform (spindle-shaped) and homoblastic (created from several internodes). Oeceoclades ambrensis is most similar to O. pulchra but it differs in the structure of the labellum, having rounded lobes.
