= Oeceoclades ambongensis =

Scientific classification
- Kingdom: Plantae
- Clade: Tracheophytes
- Clade: Angiosperms
- Clade: Monocots
- Order: Asparagales
- Family: Orchidaceae
- Subfamily: Epidendroideae
- Genus: Oeceoclades
- Species: O. ambongensis

Binomial name
- Oeceoclades ambongensis (Schltr.) Garay & P.Taylor

Synonyms
- Eulophidium ambongense Schltr.; Eulophia schlechteri H.Perrier; Lissochilus schlechteri (H.Perrier) H.Perrier

Species of orchid

Oeceoclades ambongensis is a terrestrial orchid species in the genus Oeceoclades that is endemic to Madagascar. It was first described by the German botanist Rudolf Schlechter in 1913 as Eulophidium ambongense. When Leslie Andrew Garay and Peter Taylor revised the genus Oeceoclades in 1976, they transferred this species to the expanded Oeceoclades as O. ambongensis. Garay and Taylor noted that this species could be distinguished from closely allied species, such as O. maculata by its larger flowers with subglobose (nearly spherical) spur and a bilobed callus on the labellum.
