= Oeceoclades furcata =

Scientific classification
- Kingdom: Plantae
- Clade: Tracheophytes
- Clade: Angiosperms
- Clade: Monocots
- Order: Asparagales
- Family: Orchidaceae
- Subfamily: Epidendroideae
- Genus: Oeceoclades
- Species: O. furcata

Binomial name
- Oeceoclades furcata Bosser & Morat

Species of orchid

Oeceoclades furcata is a terrestrial orchid species in the genus Oeceoclades that is endemic to northwestern Madagascar, where it grows in sandy soils. It was first described by the French botanists Jean Marie Bosser and Philippe Morat in 2001. The type specimen was collected in 1943 by the French botanist Raymond Decary from the Soalala District; this is the only known specimen of the species. The specific epithet furcata refers to the distinctive forked floral spur.

== Description ==
The conical pseudobulbs are 1–2 cm (0.39–0.79 in) high and heteroblastic (derived from a single internode). The ovate to wedge shaped leaves are 4–5.5 cm (1.6–2.2 in) long by 2–2.5 cm (0.79–0.98 in) wide with smooth margins that can become wavy. There is a single leathery leaf on each pseudobulb with a 0.8–1.3 cm (0.31–0.51 in) long petiole with a joint near the base of the leaf blade. Inflorescences are up to 60 cm (24 in) long with two to three sheathing, overlapping bracts at the base of the peduncle. The inflorescence is a simple raceme with about 15 widely spaced yellowish-white flowers with wine-colored spots. The sepals are 7–8 mm (0.28–0.31 in) long by 2–2.5 mm (0.079–0.098 in) wide and petals are slightly shorter than the sepals. The labellum is four-lobed and has a 4–5 mm (0.16–0.20 in) long spur that is bent backwards and forked at the apex.
