= Oeceoclades cordylinophylla =

Scientific classification
- Kingdom: Plantae
- Clade: Tracheophytes
- Clade: Angiosperms
- Clade: Monocots
- Order: Asparagales
- Family: Orchidaceae
- Subfamily: Epidendroideae
- Genus: Oeceoclades
- Species: O. cordylinophylla

Binomial name
- Oeceoclades cordylinophylla (Rchb.f.) Garay & P.Taylor

Synonyms
- Eulophia cordylinophylla Rchb.f.; Lissochilus cordylinophyllus (Rchb.f.) H.Perrier; Eulophidium cordylinophyllum (Rchb.f.) Summerh.; Eulophia lokobensis H.Perrier; Lissochilus lokobensis (H.Perrier) H.Perrier; Eulophidium lokobense (H.Perrier) Summerh.

Species of orchid

Oeceoclades cordylinophylla is a terrestrial orchid species in the genus Oeceoclades that is native to Comoros and northern Madagascar. It was first described by the German botanist Heinrich Gustav Reichenbach in 1885 as Eulophia cordylinophylla. It was first transferred to the genus Lissochilus by Joseph Marie Henry Alfred Perrier de la Bâthie in 1941, then to the genus Eulophidium by V.S. Summerhayes in 1957, and later to the genus Oeceoclades in 1976 by Leslie Andrew Garay and Peter Taylor. The type specimen was collected from the Comoro Islands by Léon Humblot, but the actual specimen is missing. Garay and Taylor indicated that an herbarium sheet of Humblot's with an unpublished name by Reichenbach appears to align well with the original description. The margins of the column wings of O. cordylinophylla are ciliolate-hirsute, fringed with stiff, minute hairs.
