= Disa dichroa =

Conservation status
- Data Deficient (IUCN 3.1)

Scientific classification
- Kingdom: Plantae
- Clade: Tracheophytes
- Clade: Angiosperms
- Clade: Monocots
- Order: Asparagales
- Family: Orchidaceae
- Subfamily: Orchidoideae
- Genus: Disa
- Species: D. dichroa

Binomial name
- Disa dichroa Summerh.

Synonyms
- Disa aconitoides var. dichroa (Summerh.) Geerinck; Disa concinna var. dichroa (Summerh.) Geerinck

Species of flowering plant

Disa dichroa is a perennial plant and geophyte belonging to the genus Disa. The plant is native to the Democratic Republic of the Congo and Zambia.
