= Oeceoclades boinensis =

Scientific classification
- Kingdom: Plantae
- Clade: Tracheophytes
- Clade: Angiosperms
- Clade: Monocots
- Order: Asparagales
- Family: Orchidaceae
- Subfamily: Epidendroideae
- Genus: Oeceoclades
- Species: O. boinensis

Binomial name
- Oeceoclades boinensis (Schltr.) Garay & P.Taylor

Synonyms
- Eulophidium boinense Schltr.; Lissochilus boinensis (Schltr.) H.Perrier

Species of orchid

Oeceoclades boinensis is a terrestrial orchid species in the genus Oeceoclades that is endemic to northern and western Madagascar. It was first described by the German botanist Rudolf Schlechter in 1913 as Eulophidium boinense. It was first transferred to the genus Lissochilus by Joseph Marie Henry Alfred Perrier de la Bâthie in 1941 and later to the genus Oeceoclades in 1976 by Leslie Andrew Garay and Peter Taylor. Garay and Taylor suggested that this species is closely related to O. rauhii, the two species being allied by the cordate (heart-shaped) base of the leaves but differing in floral structures.
