= Restrepia chocoensis =

Chocó restrepia

Scientific classification
- Kingdom: Plantae
- Clade: Tracheophytes
- Clade: Angiosperms
- Clade: Monocots
- Order: Asparagales
- Family: Orchidaceae
- Subfamily: Epidendroideae
- Genus: Restrepia
- Species: R. chocoensis

Binomial name
- Restrepia chocoensis Garay

Species of orchid

Restrepia chocoensis is a species of flowering plant in the family Orchidaceae. It is named for the Department of Chocó, Colombia, where it was discovered.

This rare epiphytic species has only been found on two occasions in the cool, damp montane forests of the Western Cordillera of Colombia at altitudes between 1,800 m to 2,000 m.

This tiny orchid lacks pseudobulbs. The erect, thick, leathery leaf is elliptic-ovate in shape. The aerial roots seem like fine hairs.

The flowers develop one at a time at the base of the leaf. They are borne on a slender peduncle, originating from the base of the back of the leaf. The long dorsal sepal is erect and ends in a somewhat thicker club-shaped tip. They have fused lateral sepals (synsepals), which splits at its end. They are quite colorful : tan overlaid with contrasting reddish-purple spots. The long, lateral petals equally end in a thickened club-shaped tip. The shorter lip is ovoid. It shows the same variations in color and markings.
