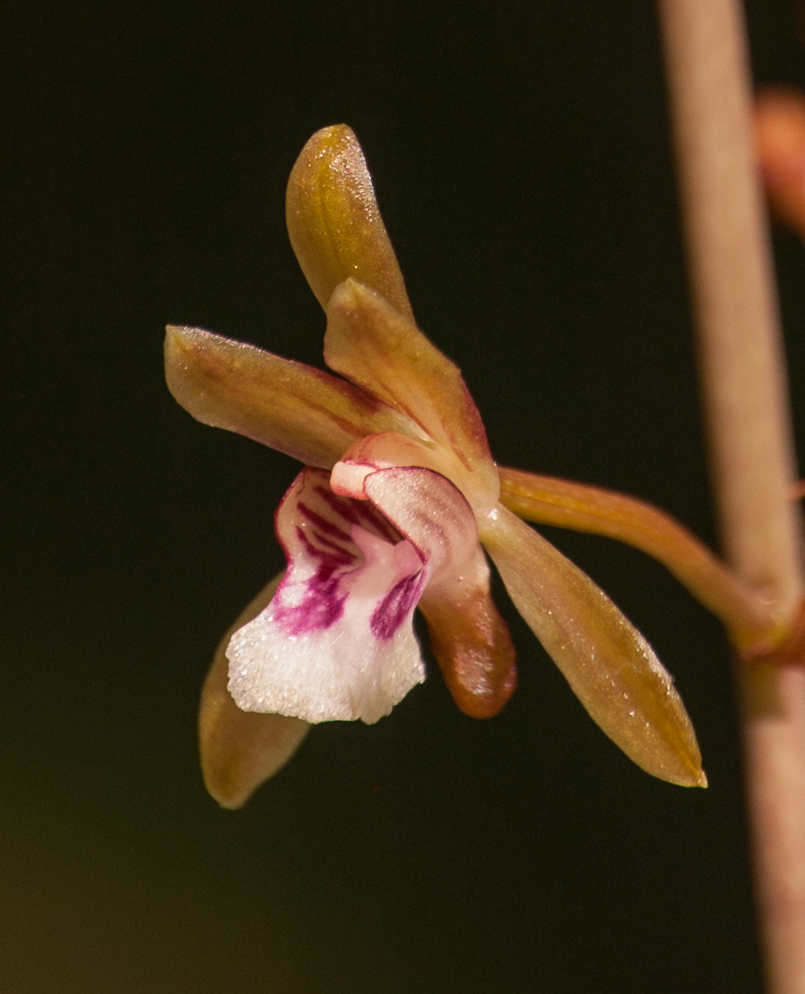

Scientific classification
- Kingdom: Plantae
- Clade: Tracheophytes
- Clade: Angiosperms
- Clade: Monocots
- Order: Asparagales
- Family: Orchidaceae
- Subfamily: Epidendroideae
- Genus: Oeceoclades
- Species: O. gracillima

Binomial name
- Oeceoclades gracillima (Schltr.) Garay & P.Taylor

Synonyms
- Eulophidium gracillimum Schltr.; Lissochilus gracillimus (Schltr.) H.Perrier; Eulophia gracillima Schltr., nom. illeg.; Eulophidium roseovariegatum Senghas; Oeceoclades roseovariegata (Senghas) Garay & P.Taylor

= Oeceoclades gracillima =

Species of orchid

Oeceoclades gracillima, sometimes known in horticulture by the synonym Oeceoclades roseovariegata, is a terrestrial orchid species in the genus Oeceoclades that is endemic to Madagascar. It was first described by the German botanist Rudolf Schlechter under the illegitimate name Eulophia gracillima in 1913. Schlecter later validly republished the species under the name Eulophidium gracillimum in 1925. It was then moved to the genus Oeceoclades by Leslie Andrew Garay and Peter Taylor in 1976.

Oeceoclades gracillima is found mostly in dry soils in southern and western Madagascar.
