= Oeceoclades petiolata =

Scientific classification
- Kingdom: Plantae
- Clade: Tracheophytes
- Clade: Angiosperms
- Clade: Monocots
- Order: Asparagales
- Family: Orchidaceae
- Subfamily: Epidendroideae
- Genus: Oeceoclades
- Species: O. petiolata

Binomial name
- Oeceoclades petiolata (Schltr.) Garay & P.Taylor

Synonyms
- Eulophia petiolata Schltr.; Eulophidium petiolatum (Schltr.) Schltr.; Lissochilus petiolatus (Schltr.) H.Perrier

Species of orchid

Oeceoclades petiolata is a terrestrial orchid species in the genus Oeceoclades that is endemic to northern and western Madagascar. It was first described by the German botanist Rudolf Schlechter in 1913 as Eulophia petiolata. Schlechter later moved this species to the genus Eulophidium in 1925. It was again moved to the genus Lissochilus by the French botanist Joseph Marie Henry Alfred Perrier de la Bâthie in 1941 and last transferred the genus Oeceoclades in 1976 by Leslie Andrew Garay and Peter Taylor. Garay and Taylor noted that this species is almost identical to O. alismatophylla in vegetative morphology, but the two differ in the shape of the labellum on the flower. The labellum is fiddle-shaped and has three thickened veins in front of the calli.
