= Oeceoclades lanceata =

Scientific classification
- Kingdom: Plantae
- Clade: Tracheophytes
- Clade: Angiosperms
- Clade: Monocots
- Order: Asparagales
- Family: Orchidaceae
- Subfamily: Epidendroideae
- Genus: Oeceoclades
- Species: O. lanceata

Binomial name
- Oeceoclades lanceata (H.Perrier) Garay & P.Taylor

Synonyms
- Eulophia lanceata H.Perrier

Species of orchid

Oeceoclades lanceata is a terrestrial orchid species in the genus Oeceoclades that is endemic to central Madagascar. The flowers are rose-colored. It was first described by the French botanist Joseph Marie Henry Alfred Perrier de la Bâthie in 1935 as Eulophia lanceata. Perrier then later reduced the species to a synonym of Eulophia pandurata (now Oeceoclades pandurata). The species was resurrected and transferred to the genus Oeceoclades in 1976 by Leslie Andrew Garay and Peter Taylor, who argued that O. lanceata and O. pandurata are distinct with regard to their floral structure and shape of the labellum. Garay and Taylor noted that O. lanceata is similar in vegetative morphology to O. seychellarum.
