= Oeceoclades humbertii =

Scientific classification
- Kingdom: Plantae
- Clade: Tracheophytes
- Clade: Angiosperms
- Clade: Monocots
- Order: Asparagales
- Family: Orchidaceae
- Subfamily: Epidendroideae
- Genus: Oeceoclades
- Species: O. humbertii

Binomial name
- Oeceoclades humbertii (H.Perrier) Bosser & Morat

Synonyms
- Lissochilus humbertii H.Perrier; Eulophia humbertii (H.Perrier) Butzin

Species of orchid

Oeceoclades humbertii is a terrestrial orchid species in the genus Oeceoclades that is endemic to southeastern Madagascar, where it grows in xerophilous bush at altitudes from 500 to 600 m (1,600 to 2,000 ft). It was first described by the French botanist Joseph Marie Henry Alfred Perrier de la Bâthie in 1939 as Lissochilus humbertii and moved to the genus Eulophia in 1975 by Friedhelm Reinhold Butzin. It was last transferred to the genus Oeceoclades in 2001 by Jean Marie Bosser and Philippe Morat. The type specimen was collected from the left bank of the Manambolo valley in the Mandrare River basin in either December 1933 or January 1934 when it was recorded as flowering by its collector Jean-Henri Humbert for whom the specific epithet humbertii honors. The small pseudobulbs are conical and heteroblastic (derived from only one internode). Oeceoclades humbertii is distinguished from all other Oeceoclades by its completely green flowers. It has only been collected twice including the type specimen; the other specimen was collected by Philippe Morat in 1973 from the Onilahy valley in the Ankazoabo gorges north of Betioky.
