= Disa aequiloba =

Conservation status
- Endangered (IUCN 3.1)

Scientific classification
- Kingdom: Plantae
- Clade: Tracheophytes
- Clade: Angiosperms
- Clade: Monocots
- Order: Asparagales
- Family: Orchidaceae
- Subfamily: Orchidoideae
- Genus: Disa
- Species: D. aequiloba

Binomial name
- Disa aequiloba Summerh.

Species of flowering plant

Disa aequiloba is a perennial plant and geophyte belonging to the genus Disa. The plant is found in Angola, the Democratic Republic of the Congo, Tanzania and Zambia.
