= Oeceoclades calcarata =

Scientific classification
- Kingdom: Plantae
- Clade: Tracheophytes
- Clade: Angiosperms
- Clade: Monocots
- Order: Asparagales
- Family: Orchidaceae
- Subfamily: Epidendroideae
- Genus: Oeceoclades
- Species: O. calcarata

Binomial name
- Oeceoclades calcarata (Schltr.) Garay & P.Taylor

Synonyms
- Cymbidium calcaratum Schltr.; Eulophia calcarata (Schltr.) Schltr.; Eulophia paniculata Rolfe; Lissochilus paniculatus (Rolfe) H.Perrier; Eulophidium paniculatum (Rolfe) Summerh.

Species of orchid

Oeceoclades calcarata is a terrestrial orchid species in the genus Oeceoclades that is endemic to Madagascar. It was first described by the British botanist Robert Allen Rolfe in 1905 as Eulophia paniculata. The German botanist Rudolf Schlechter later described this species as Cymbidium calcaratum in 1915 and then transferred his own taxon to the genus Eulophia (as E. calcarata) in 1925. When Leslie Andrew Garay and Peter Taylor revised the genus Oeceoclades in 1976, they transferred this species to the expanded Oeceoclades as O. calcarata because even though Eulophia paniculata was the older name and thus had priority, there had already been an earlier species named Oeceoclades paniculata (so named by John Lindley and now recognized as a species in the genus Robiquetia) that prevented using that specific epithet.

Garay and Taylor noted that among all the species in the genus Oeceoclades, this one is unique in possessing a forward-projecting spur under the labellum.
