= Oeceoclades sclerophylla =

Scientific classification
- Kingdom: Plantae
- Clade: Tracheophytes
- Clade: Angiosperms
- Clade: Monocots
- Order: Asparagales
- Family: Orchidaceae
- Subfamily: Epidendroideae
- Genus: Oeceoclades
- Species: O. sclerophylla

Binomial name
- Oeceoclades sclerophylla (Rchb.f.) Garay & P.Taylor

Synonyms
- Eulophia sclerophylla Rchb.f.; Eulophidium sclerophyllum (Rchb.f.) Summerh.; Eulophia elliotii Rolfe; Lissochilus elliotii (Rolfe) H.Perrier

Species of orchid

Oeceoclades sclerophylla is a terrestrial orchid species in the genus Oeceoclades that is native to Comoros and southeastern Madagascar. It was first described by the German botanist Heinrich Gustav Reichenbach in 1885 as Eulophia sclerophylla. It was later transferred to the genus Oeceoclades in 1976 by Leslie Andrew Garay and Peter Taylor. Oeceoclades sclerophylla has long, linear leaves, a feature that is shared with O. analavelensis and O. quadriloba, but it differs from these species in the proportions of the size of labellum lobes.
