= Oeceoclades beravensis =

Scientific classification
- Kingdom: Plantae
- Clade: Tracheophytes
- Clade: Angiosperms
- Clade: Monocots
- Order: Asparagales
- Family: Orchidaceae
- Subfamily: Epidendroideae
- Genus: Oeceoclades
- Species: O. beravensis

Binomial name
- Oeceoclades beravensis (Rchb.f.) R.Bone & Buerki

Synonyms
- Eulophia beravensis Rchb.f.; Graphorkis beravensis (Rchb.f.) Kuntze; Lissochilus beravensis (Rchb.f.) H.Perrier

Species of orchid

Oeceoclades beravensis is a terrestrial orchid species in the genus Oeceoclades that is endemic to the southern and western Madagascar where it grows in the sandy soils of western dry forests and wooded grasslands. This species has cane-like stems and forms dense clumps in the understorey, a feature that makes it unique among the Eulophiinae species found in Madagascar. Like other orchid species in Eulophia and Oeceoclades that are adapted to arid climates, O. beravensis has narrow and coriaceous (leathery and stiff, but flexible) leaves with minute serrations.

Because of habitat loss and existing threats to the dry forests and grasslands of Madagascar, O. beravensis was preliminarily assessed as "Near Threatened" using the International Union for Conservation of Nature guidelines.

It was first described by the German botanist Heinrich Gustav Reichenbach in 1881 as Eulophia beravensis and later moved to the genus Lissochilus by the French botanist Joseph Marie Henry Alfred Perrier de la Bâthie in 1941. It was overlooked by Leslie Andrew Garay and Peter Taylor when they reinstated the genus Oeceoclades in 1976 and finally transferred to that genus in 2014 by Ruth Bone and Sven Buerki.
