= Oeceoclades callmanderi =

Scientific classification
- Kingdom: Plantae
- Clade: Tracheophytes
- Clade: Angiosperms
- Clade: Monocots
- Order: Asparagales
- Family: Orchidaceae
- Subfamily: Epidendroideae
- Genus: Oeceoclades
- Species: O. callmanderi

Binomial name
- Oeceoclades callmanderi Bosser

Species of orchid

Oeceoclades callmanderi is a species of terrestrial orchid in the genus Oeceoclades that is endemic to northeastern Madagascar, where it grows in the coastal forests of Cape Masoala. It was first described by the French botanist Jean Marie Bosser in 2006 and named in honor of one of the collectors, M. W. Callmander.
