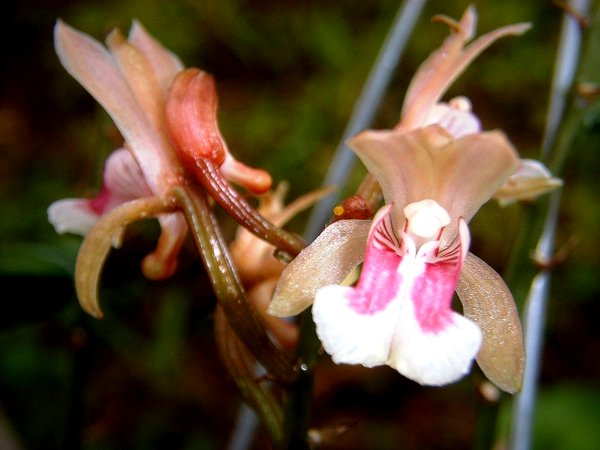
- Oeceoclades maculata

Scientific classification
- Kingdom: Plantae
- Clade: Embryophytes
- Clade: Tracheophytes
- Clade: Angiosperms
- Clade: Monocots
- Order: Asparagales
- Family: Orchidaceae
- Subfamily: Epidendroideae
- Genus: Oeceoclades
- Species: O. maculata

Binomial name
- Oeceoclades maculata (Lindl.) Lindl.

Synonyms
- Angraecum maculatum Lindl.; Limodorum maculatum (Lindl.) G.Lodd.; Aerobion maculatum (Lindl.) Spreng.; Eulophia maculata (Lindl.) Rchb.f.; Eulophidium maculatum (Lindl.) Pfitzer; Graphorkis maculata (Lindl.) Kuntze; Eulophia mackenii Rolfe ex Hemsl.; Eulophidium mackenii (Rolfe ex Hemsl.) Schltr.; Oeceoclades mackenii (Rolfe ex Hemsl.) Garay & P.Taylor

= Oeceoclades maculata =

Species of orchid

Oeceoclades maculata, sometimes known as the monk orchid or African spotted orchid, is a terrestrial orchid species in the genus Oeceoclades that is native to tropical Africa and now naturalized in South and Central America, the Caribbean, and Florida in North America. It was first described by the English botanist John Lindley as Angraecum maculatum in 1821 based on a specimen collected from South America. Lindley later revised his original placement and moved the species to the genus Oeceoclades in 1833.

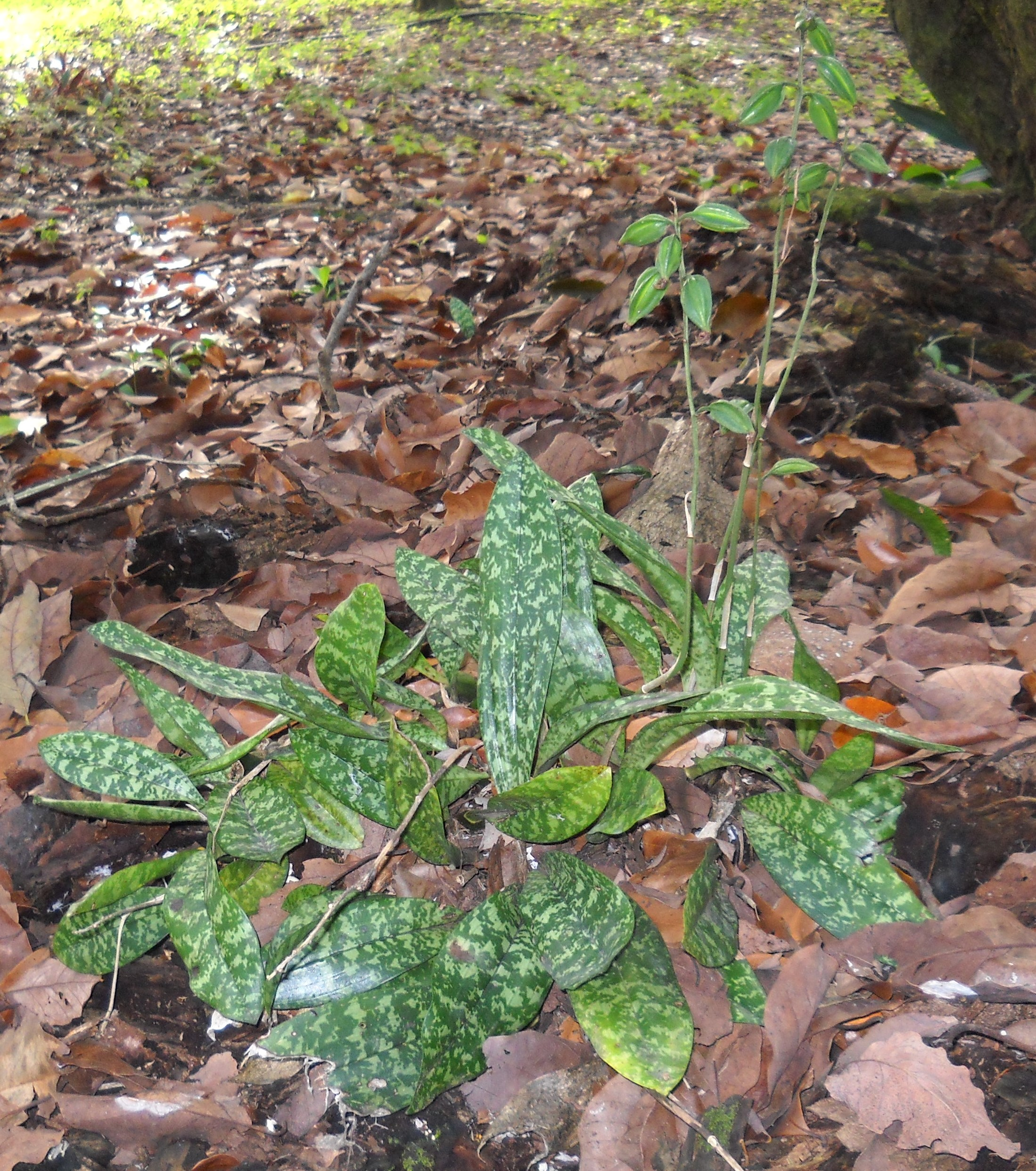
Group of Oeceoclades maculata with infructescences

Oeceoclades maculata was first found naturalized outside of Africa in Brazil in 1829. It was later found throughout the Neotropics and specifically in Puerto Rico in the mid-1960s and in Florida in the early 1970s. It is considered to be one of the most successful invasive orchids.

When Leslie Andrew Garay and Peter Taylor resurrected and revised the genus Oeceoclades in 1976, they recognized O. maculata and two related species, O. mackenii and O. monophylla. All three were described as being very similar in appearance and according to Garay and Taylor, the species could be distinguished by the proportions of the labellum, allowing for easy identification in preserved specimens or in the field in their opinion. Oeceoclades mackenii was said to have a labellum that was shorter than wide and possessed a branched inflorescence, while the labellum of O. monophylla had a "distinct elongate isthmus." Garay and Taylor also recognized the subspecies O. maculata subsp. pterocarpa, which was said to have winged capsules. Later authors did not agree with recognizing these distinctions as sufficient to maintain separate taxa and thus reduced these names to synonyms of O. maculata.
