= Oeceoclades versicolor =

Scientific classification
- Kingdom: Plantae
- Clade: Tracheophytes
- Clade: Angiosperms
- Clade: Monocots
- Order: Asparagales
- Family: Orchidaceae
- Subfamily: Epidendroideae
- Genus: Oeceoclades
- Species: O. versicolor

Binomial name
- Oeceoclades versicolor (Frapp. ex Cordem.) J.-B.Castillon

Synonyms
- Eulophia versicolor Frapp. ex Cordem.; Oeceoclades bernetii J.-B.Castillon

Species of orchid

Oeceoclades versicolor is a terrestrial orchid species in the genus Oeceoclades that is endemic to Réunion in the Indian Ocean. In 1880, the French botanist Charles Frappier published a list of 145 orchids that grew on the island of Réunion, but Frappier died before he could complete his studies and formally describe all of the species. Frappier's work was continued by Eugène Jacob de Cordemoy and in his 1895 work "Flore de l'île de La Réunion", he described Eulophia versicolor and attributed the name to Frappier, although the name did not appear on the 1880 list of Réunion's orchids.

In 2014, the French orchid enthusiast and collector Jean-Bernard Castillon reviewed herbarium material and transferred the species from the genus Eulophia to Oeceoclades based on several morphological features.
