= Oeceoclades lavergneae =

Scientific classification
- Kingdom: Plantae
- Clade: Tracheophytes
- Clade: Angiosperms
- Clade: Monocots
- Order: Asparagales
- Family: Orchidaceae
- Subfamily: Epidendroideae
- Genus: Oeceoclades
- Species: O. lavergneae

Binomial name
- Oeceoclades lavergneae J.-B.Castillon

Species of orchid

Oeceoclades lavergneae is a terrestrial orchid species in the genus Oeceoclades that is endemic to Réunion in the Indian Ocean. It was first described by French orchid enthusiast and collector Jean-Bernard Castillon in 2012. The type specimen was collected from the forests on the western cliffs of the island along the Rivière des Galets at about 700 m (2,297 ft) elevation.
