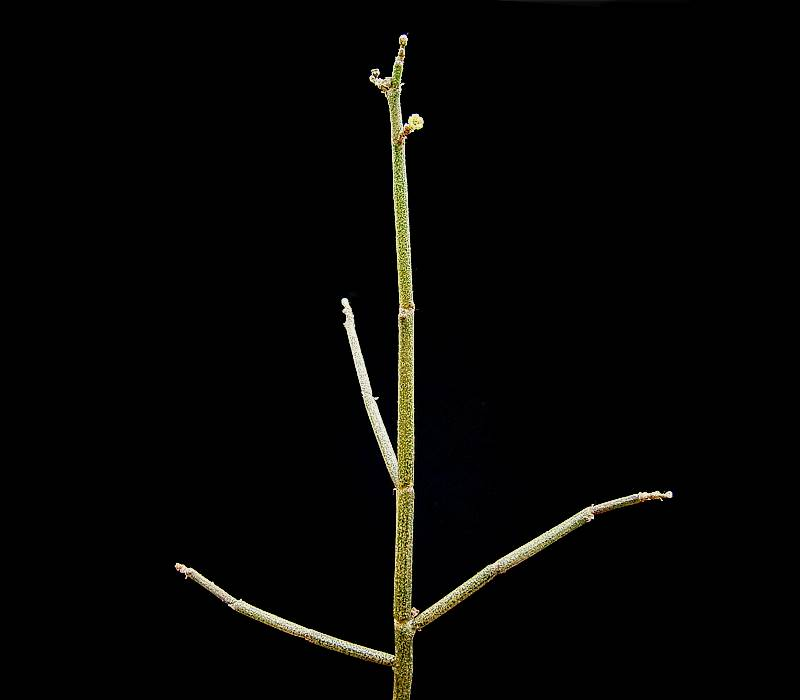

Conservation status
- Vulnerable (IUCN 3.1)

Scientific classification
- Kingdom: Plantae
- Clade: Tracheophytes
- Clade: Angiosperms
- Clade: Eudicots
- Clade: Rosids
- Order: Malpighiales
- Family: Euphorbiaceae
- Genus: Euphorbia
- Species: E. bosseri

Binomial name
- Euphorbia bosseri Leandri

Synonyms
- Euphorbia platyclada Rauh; Tirucalia platyclada (Rauh) P.V.Heath

= Euphorbia bosseri =

Species of flowering plant

Euphorbia bosseri is a species of flowering plant in the family Euphorbiaceae. It is endemic to Madagascar. Its natural habitat is subtropical or tropical dry forests. It is threatened by habitat loss. The species epithet commemorates Jean Marie Bosser, a Mauritian botanist who contributed largely to the flora of Madagascar.
