= Oeceoclades quadriloba =

Scientific classification
- Kingdom: Plantae
- Clade: Tracheophytes
- Clade: Angiosperms
- Clade: Monocots
- Order: Asparagales
- Family: Orchidaceae
- Subfamily: Epidendroideae
- Genus: Oeceoclades
- Species: O. quadriloba

Binomial name
- Oeceoclades quadriloba (Schltr.) Garay & P.Taylor

Synonyms
- Eulophia quadriloba Schltr.; Eulophidium quadrilobum (Schltr.) Schltr.; Lissochilus quadrilobus (Schltr.) H.Perrier

Species of orchid

Oeceoclades quadriloba is a terrestrial orchid species in the genus Oeceoclades that is native to Eswatini, southern Zimbabwe, and western Madagascar. It was first described by the German botanist Rudolf Schlechter in 1913 as Eulophia quadriloba. Schlechter later moved this species to the genus Eulophidium in 1925. It was again moved to the genus Lissochilus by the French botanist Joseph Marie Henry Alfred Perrier de la Bâthie in 1941 and last transferred the genus Oeceoclades in 1976 by Leslie Andrew Garay and Peter Taylor. Garay and Taylor noted that structure of the labellum is unique in the genus and resembles that of an Asian genus of orchids, Grosourdya. The spur is longer than the midlobe of the labellum.
