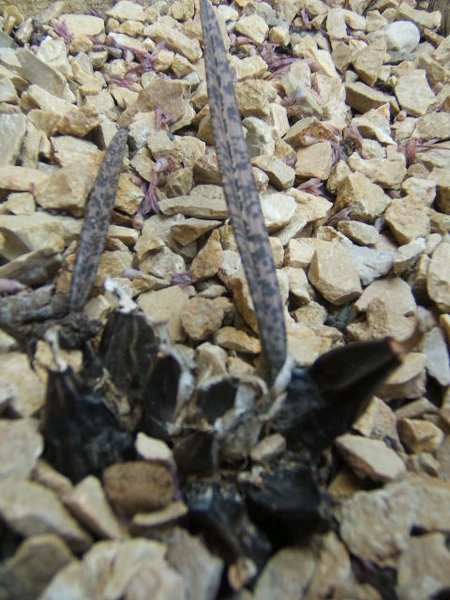

Scientific classification
- Kingdom: Plantae
- Clade: Tracheophytes
- Clade: Angiosperms
- Clade: Monocots
- Order: Asparagales
- Family: Orchidaceae
- Subfamily: Epidendroideae
- Genus: Oeceoclades
- Species: O. decaryana

Binomial name
- Oeceoclades decaryana (H.Perrier) Garay & P.Taylor

Synonyms
- Eulophia decaryana H.Perrier; Lissochilus decaryanus (H.Perrier) H.Perrier; Eulophidium decaryanum (H.Perrier) Summerh.

= Oeceoclades decaryana =

Species of orchid

Oeceoclades decaryana is a terrestrial orchid species of the genus Oeceoclades that is native throughout southern and southeastern Africa. It can be found growing in Kenya, Mozambique, Zimbabwe, Madagascar, and KwaZulu-Natal in South Africa. It was first described by the French botanist Joseph Marie Henry Alfred Perrier de la Bâthie in 1935 as a species in the genus Eulophia. He later transferred this species to the genus Lissochilus in 1941, followed by another transfer to the genus Eulophidium in 1957 by the English botanist V.S. Summerhayes in 1957. When Leslie Andrew Garay and Peter Taylor revised the genus Oeceoclades in 1976, they transferred this species to the expanded Oeceoclades.
