= Eulophia stenopetala =

Conservation status
- Extinct (IUCN 3.1)

Scientific classification
- Kingdom: Plantae
- Clade: Tracheophytes
- Clade: Angiosperms
- Clade: Monocots
- Order: Asparagales
- Family: Orchidaceae
- Subfamily: Epidendroideae
- Genus: Eulophia
- Species: †E. stenopetala

Binomial name
- †Eulophia stenopetala Lindl.

Synonyms
- Graphorkis stenopetala (Lindl.) Kuntze

Species of orchid

Eulophia stenopetala is a species of orchid endemic to Bhutan. The only material on this species from Bhutan is the holotype specimen collected by William Griffith in Bhutan in 1838 and resides at the Kew Herbarium with catalogue number K000852991. Another specimen without any information on its location is also available at the Naturalis Biodiversity Center with catalogue number U.1466607. The plant is currently considered extinct as numerous attempts to find it in the type locality failed.

== Etymology ==
The epithet "stenopetala" was derived from Greek meaning narrow petals.

== Description ==
This is a terrestrial orchid which grows on dry hills at around 1800m. It grows to 30-50cm in height. Pseudobulbs are irregular and the flowering scape is erect and ridged with clasping sheaths. Clasping sheaths are distant and ovate-lanceolate in shape. Two leaves present and they are linear in shape. Flowers are purple with darker purple veins. Special character if this species is the club-shaped spur of the flower.

== Type status ==
The type locality of this plant is near Thinleygang in Punakha District.
