= Eulophia dentata =

Conservation status
- Endangered (IUCN 3.1)

Scientific classification
- Kingdom: Plantae
- Clade: Tracheophytes
- Clade: Angiosperms
- Clade: Monocots
- Order: Asparagales
- Family: Orchidaceae
- Subfamily: Epidendroideae
- Genus: Eulophia
- Species: E. dentata

Binomial name
- Eulophia dentata Ames, Philipp., 1911

Species of orchid

Eulophia dentata is a species of plant in the family Orchidaceae. It is found in Taiwan and the Philippines.

== Synonyms ==
The following are heterotypic synonyms :

- Eulophia taiwanensis Hayata, 1911
- Eulophia kitamurae Masam, 1932
- Eulophia segawae Fukuy, 1934
- Eulophia graminea var. kitamurae Masam.) S.S.Ying, 1977
