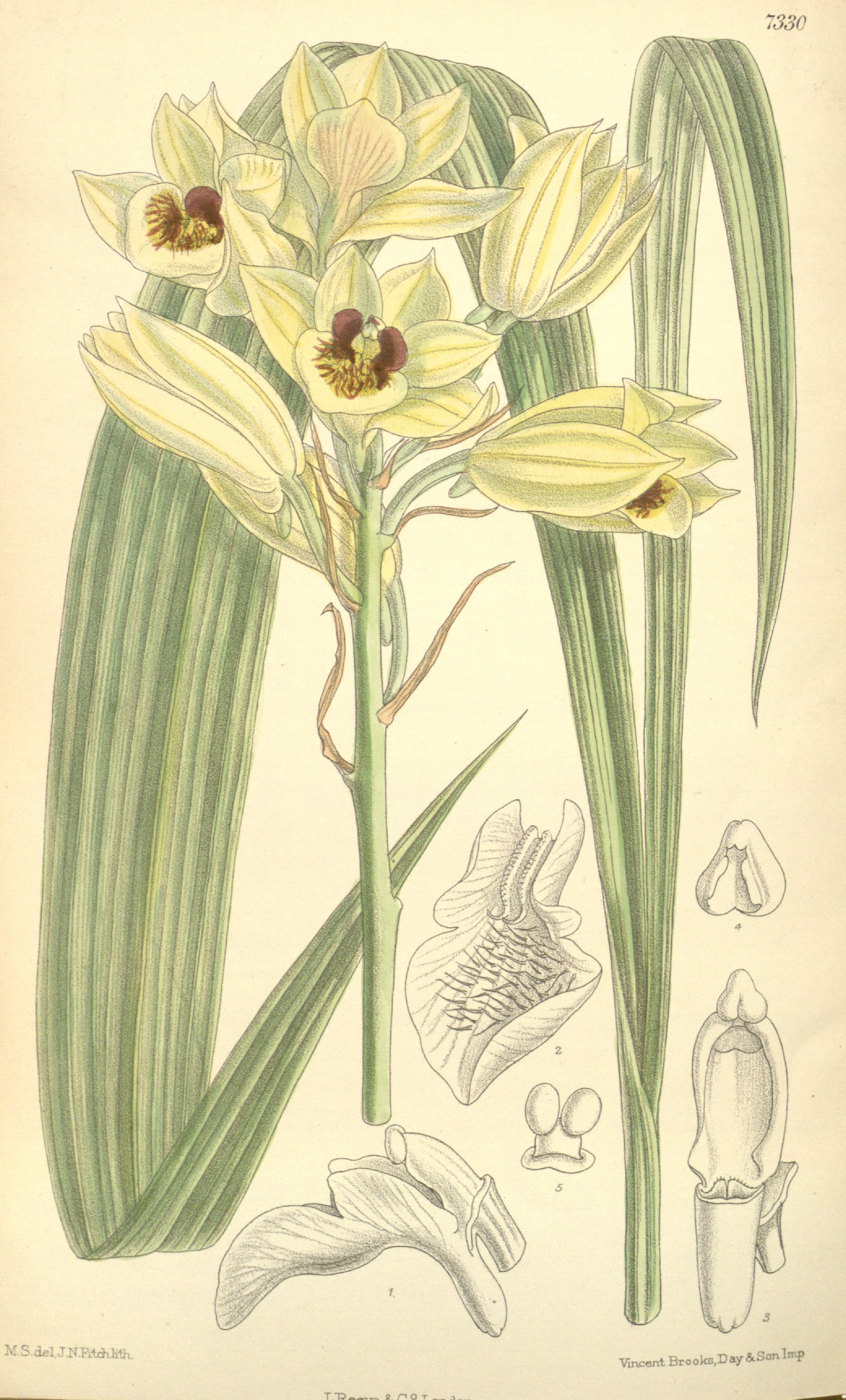

Scientific classification
- Kingdom: Plantae
- Clade: Tracheophytes
- Clade: Angiosperms
- Clade: Monocots
- Order: Asparagales
- Family: Orchidaceae
- Subfamily: Epidendroideae
- Genus: Eulophia
- Species: E. mechowii

Binomial name
- Eulophia mechowii (Rchb.f.) T.Durand & Schinz

Synonyms
- Eulophia amblypetala Kraenzl.; Eulophia bicolor Rchb.f. & Sond., nom. illeg.; Eulophia granducalis Kraenzl.; Eulophia lujae De Wild.; Eulophia milanjiana Rendle; Eulophia praestans Rendle; Eulophia woodii Schltr.; Eulophia zeyheri Hook.f.; Orthochilus mechowii Rchb.f.; Orthochilus zeyheri (Hook.f.) Szlach.

= Eulophia mechowii =

Species of orchid

Eulophia mechowii is a species of orchid. It is native from Nigeria to Western Ethiopia and South Africa. In 2014, it was proposed that it should be transferred to the genus Orthochilus as Orthochilus mechowii. As of December 2023, Plants of the World Online did not accept the transfer.
