= Oeceoclades aurea =

Scientific classification
- Kingdom: Plantae
- Clade: Tracheophytes
- Clade: Angiosperms
- Clade: Monocots
- Order: Asparagales
- Family: Orchidaceae
- Subfamily: Epidendroideae
- Genus: Oeceoclades
- Species: O. aurea

Binomial name
- Oeceoclades aurea Loubr.

Species of orchid

Oeceoclades aurea is a terrestrial orchid species in the genus Oeceoclades that is endemic to Madagascar. It was first described by Xavier Garreau de Loubresse in a 1994 issue of the French orchid society journal Orchidée.
