= Oeceoclades atrovirens =

Scientific classification
- Kingdom: Plantae
- Clade: Tracheophytes
- Clade: Angiosperms
- Clade: Monocots
- Order: Asparagales
- Family: Orchidaceae
- Subfamily: Epidendroideae
- Genus: Oeceoclades
- Species: O. atrovirens

Binomial name
- Oeceoclades atrovirens (Lindl.) Garay & P.Taylor

Synonyms
- Eulophia atrovirens Lindl.; Graphorkis atrovirens (Lindl.) Kuntze

Species of orchid

Oeceoclades atrovirens is a terrestrial orchid species in the genus Oeceoclades. It was first described by the English botanist John Lindley in 1833 as Eulophia atrovirens and later transferred to the genus Oeceoclades in 1976 by Leslie Andrew Garay and Peter Taylor. Lindley based his initial description of the species on a color drawing that Nathaniel Wallich completed in 1828 for the East India Company. No specimens of this plant are known, so this species is only represented by the single illustration. Wallich indicated on the drawing that the species was seen in India, but he did not provide a specific location. The World Checklist of Selected Plant Families lists the distribution of O. atrovirens, with some uncertainty, as possibly being in India or Mauritius.
