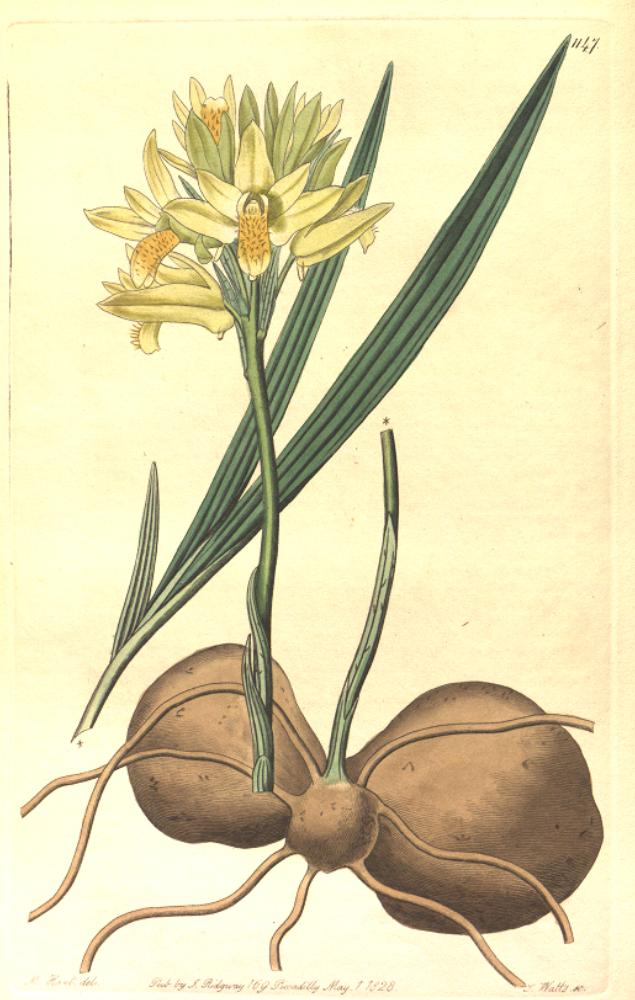

Scientific classification
- Kingdom: Plantae
- Clade: Tracheophytes
- Clade: Angiosperms
- Clade: Monocots
- Order: Asparagales
- Family: Orchidaceae
- Subfamily: Epidendroideae
- Genus: Eulophia
- Species: E. ensata

Binomial name
- Eulophia ensata Lindl.

Synonyms
- Eulophia oblonga Rolfe; Graphorkis ensata (Lindl.) Kuntze; Orthochilus ensatus (Lindl.) Bytebier

= Eulophia ensata =

Species of orchid

Eulophia ensata is a species of orchid, occurring from Mozambique to South Africa. In 2014, it was proposed that the species should be transferred to the genus Orthochilus as Orthochilus ensatus, but as of December 2023 this was not accepted by Plants of the World Online.
