= Eulophia coddii =

Conservation status
- Endangered (IUCN 3.1)

Scientific classification
- Kingdom: Plantae
- Clade: Tracheophytes
- Clade: Angiosperms
- Clade: Monocots
- Order: Asparagales
- Family: Orchidaceae
- Subfamily: Epidendroideae
- Genus: Eulophia
- Species: E. coddii

Binomial name
- Eulophia coddii A.V.Hall

Synonyms
- Orthochilus coddii (A.V.Hall) Szlach.

Species of orchid

Eulophia coddii is a species of flowering plant in the family Orchidaceae. It is a pseudobulbous geophyte endemic to the Northern Provinces of South Africa. Its natural habitats are subtropical or tropical dry shrubland and subtropical or tropical dry lowland grassland. It is threatened by habitat loss.
