= Eulophia meleagris =

Scientific classification
- Kingdom: Plantae
- Clade: Tracheophytes
- Clade: Angiosperms
- Clade: Monocots
- Order: Asparagales
- Family: Orchidaceae
- Subfamily: Epidendroideae
- Genus: Eulophia
- Species: E. meleagris

Binomial name
- Eulophia meleagris Rchb.f.

Species of orchid

Eulophia meleagris is an orchid species in the genus Eulophia found in East Cape Province to Mpumalanga in South Africa.
