= Eulophia dabia =

Conservation status
- Vulnerable (IUCN 3.1)

Scientific classification
- Kingdom: Plantae
- Clade: Tracheophytes
- Clade: Angiosperms
- Clade: Monocots
- Order: Asparagales
- Family: Orchidaceae
- Subfamily: Epidendroideae
- Genus: Eulophia
- Species: E. dabia

Binomial name
- Eulophia dabia (D.Don) Hochr.

Synonyms
- Bletia dabia D.Don; Cyrtopera densiflora (Lindl.) Rchb.f.; Eulophia campestris Wall. ex Lindl.; Eulophia densiflora Lindl.; Eulophia faberi Rolfe; Eulophia hemileuca Lindl.; Eulophia hormusjii Duthie; Eulophia ramentacea (Roxb.) Lindl.; Eulophia rupestris Wall. ex Lindl.; Eulophia turkestanica (Litv.) Schltr.; Geodorum ramentaceum (Roxb.) Voigt; Graphorkis campestris (Wall. ex Lindl.) Kuntze; Graphorkis dabia (D.Don) Kuntze; Graphorkis densiflora (Lindl.) Kuntze; Graphorkis rupestris (Wall. ex Lindl.) Kuntze; Limodorum dabia (D.Don) Buch.-Ham. ex D.Don; Limodorum ramentaceum Roxb.; Limodorum turkestanicum Litv.

Species of plant

Eulophia dabia is a species of flowering plant in the family Orchidaceae, native from Afghanistan to south China. It was first described by David Don in 1825 as Bletia dabia. It is classified as vulnerable by the International Union for Conservation of Nature’s redlist (IUCN).

== Description ==
Eulophia dabia is a herb, and grows up to a height of 10–32 centimetres (3.9–12.6 in). It has subterranean pseudobulbs, which are creamish-coloured and have two to five irregular brown nodes. The leaves don’t appear until a while after it flowers, and are grass-like. The oblong-lanceolate flowers are a pale-ish pink and spread out, and they flower in between February and April. The lip is also pale pink, and is three-lobed.

== Distribution ==
Eulophia dabia is native to Afghanistan, China (south-central, southeast and Hainan), the Indian subcontinent (Bangladesh, the east and west Himalayas, the Indian region, Nepal and Pakistan), and Central Asia (Tajikistan, Turkmenistan and Uzbekistan). It grows near water, particularly in sandy soil, in tropical forests’ grasslands, in coastal dunes near swamps, and semi-arid regions in general. It was first described by David Don in 1825 as Bletia dabia.

== Conservation ==
Eulophia faberi was assessed as "vulnerable" in the 2004 IUCN Red List, where it is said to be native only to China. As of February 2023, E. faberi was regarded as a synonym of Eulophia dabia, which has a much wider distribution.

E. faberi has a very low germination rate, as it is a terrestrial orchid. Such orchids have harder coatings on seeds and more acid.
