= Oeceoclades antsingyensis =

Scientific classification
- Kingdom: Plantae
- Clade: Tracheophytes
- Clade: Angiosperms
- Clade: Monocots
- Order: Asparagales
- Family: Orchidaceae
- Subfamily: Epidendroideae
- Genus: Oeceoclades
- Species: O. antsingyensis

Binomial name
- Oeceoclades antsingyensis G.Gerlach

Species of orchid

Oeceoclades antsingyensis is a terrestrial orchid species in the genus Oeceoclades that is endemic to western Madagascar. It was first described by Günter Gerlach in 1995. The type specimen was collected approximately 13 km (8.1 mi) west of Antsalova.
