= Oeceoclades pandurata =

Scientific classification
- Kingdom: Plantae
- Clade: Tracheophytes
- Clade: Angiosperms
- Clade: Monocots
- Order: Asparagales
- Family: Orchidaceae
- Subfamily: Epidendroideae
- Genus: Oeceoclades
- Species: O. pandurata

Binomial name
- Oeceoclades pandurata (Rolfe) Garay & P.Taylor

Synonyms
- Eulophia pandurata Rolfe; Lissochilus panduratus (Rolfe) H.Perrier; Eulophidium panduratum (Rolfe) Summerh.

Species of orchid

Oeceoclades pandurata is a terrestrial and epiphytic orchid species in the genus Oeceoclades that is native to eastern Zimbabwe and Madagascar. It was first described by the British botanist Robert Allen Rolfe in 1891 as Eulophia pandurata, then moved to the genus Lissochilus by Joseph Marie Henry Alfred Perrier de la Bâthie in 1941, and again moved to the genus Eulophidium by V.S. Summerhayes in 1957. It was finally transferred to the genus Oeceoclades in 1976 by Leslie Andrew Garay and Peter Taylor. Garay and Taylor noted that this species possesses lateral veins on the labellum that fringed with small hairs. Oeceoclades pandurata is distinguishable from other species in the genus by the lateral lobes of the labellum, which are free and truncate (an abrupt termination). The type specimen was collected on trees near Fort Dauphin on Madagascar, now known as the city of Tôlanaro. The specific epithet pandurata refers to the fiddle-shaped labellum.
