= Eugène Jacob de Cordemoy =

French physician and botanist

- Born: 13 July 1835; Saint-André, Réunion, France
- Died: 25 April 1911 (aged 75); Hellbourg, Salazie, Reunion
- Known for: Classification of orchids
- Scientific career
- Fields: Botanist
- Author abbrev. (botany): Cordem.

Eugène Jacob de Cordemoy (1835 in Saint-André, Réunion – 25 April 1911 in Hellbourg, Salazie, Réunion) was a French physician and botanist.

He had a particular interest in orchids, continuing the work of Charles Frappier. He is the author of Flore de l'île de la Réunion (English: Flora of the island of Réunion) published in 1895. He also studied birds.

== Bibliography ==
- Rapport sur la maladie de la canne à sucre; lu à la Chambre d'agriculture à sa session de juin 1868, Saint-Denis; G. Lahuppe, 1868.
- Rapport de la commission chargée d'étudier la catastrophe du Grand-Sablé, à Salazie, (Rapporteur : Dr Jacob de Cordemoy) Saint-Denis (Réunion) : impr. de G. Lahuppe, 1876.
- Flore de l'Île de la Réunion. Fascicule I, Cryptogames vasculaires, (fougeres, lycopodes, sélaginelles), Saint-Denis, Réunion : Typographie de la Vérité, 1891.
- Flore de l'île de la Réunion (phanérogames, cryptogames, vasculaires, muscinées) avec l'indication des propriétés économiques & industrielles des plantes, Paris, P. Klinsksieck, 1895.
