= Philippe Morat =

French botanist (1937–2025)

Philippe Morat (19 January 1937 – 14 November 2025) was a French researcher mainly in the field of tropical botany. He was a corresponding member of the French Academy of Sciences.

== Background ==
Morat was born in Saigon on 19 January 1937. An agricultural engineer from the Ecole nationale supérieure agronomique de Toulouse, he was admitted to the Institut de recherche pour le développement (IRD) in 1960 in the tropical botany section where he remained until 1986, successively in charge, master then research director during his assignments in Madagascar (12 years) and New Caledonia (9 years).

After obtaining a PhD from the University of Paris-Sud in 1972 on the origin of the savannas of south-western Madagascar, he turned his attention to taxonomy and phytogeography. Appointed Professor at the National Museum of Natural History and Director of the Phanerogamy Laboratory in 1986, he was also in charge of the National Herbarium. He was the correspondent of the French Academy of Sciences in 1999, section of Integrative Biology.

Morat retired in 2006, and died on 14 November 2025, at the age of 88.

== Scientific contributions ==
Highlighting of the anthropic origin of the majority of the savannas of Madagascar. Bioclimatic synthesis of the Big Island. Inventories and taxonomic studies of tropical plant biodiversity on islands in the Indian Ocean (Madagascar, Mascarene Islands, Aldabra, Farquhar) and the Southern Pacific (New Caledonia, Vanuatu, French Polynesia, Wallis and Futuna). Development of an innovative methodology for the study of the structure and dynamism of their vegetation. Highlighting of their floristic affinities and the establishment of their vegetation and flora in relation to their geological history. Development of a GIS and an evolving taxonomic reference system in the form of a database that has been widely used to date. Vegetation map of New Caledonia.

== Functions performed ==
- Administrator of the Museum of the National Park of Guadeloupe
- Scientific adviser to the TAAF Museum (French Southern and Antarctic Lands), the DIRCEN (Direction des Centres d'Expérimentation Nucléaires), the Nancy Conservatory and Botanical Gardens.
- Vice-President of the Council of International Organisation for Plant Information (IOPI)
- Member of the Steering Committee of the Species Plantarum Programme: Flora of the world
- Honorary Trustee of the Missouri Botanical Garden
- Deputy Editor of the "Biology" reports of the French Academy of sciences
- Director of Flores:
  - of New Caledonia
  - of Madagascar and Comoros
  - of Gabon
  - of Cambodia, Laos and Vietnam

== Publications ==
- P. Morat et J.-M. Veillon. Contribution à la connaissance de la flore et de la végétation de Wallis, Futuna et Alofi, Bull. Mus. natn. Hist. nat Paris 1985, 4^{e} sér.,7, sect.B. Adansonia, 259–330
- (en) P. Morat. Our knowledge of the flora of New Caledonia: endemism and diversity in relation to vegetation types and substrates. In the Terrestrial biota of New Caledonia. Biodiversity Letters London 1,1985 (3-4)72-81.
- (en) P. Morat et P.P. Lowry II. Floristic richness in the Africa-Madagascar Region: a brief history and prospective, Adansonia 1997, sér. 3, 19(1), 101–115.

== Books ==
The standard author abbreviation Morat is used to indicate this person as the author when citing a botanical name.

- P. Morat. Les savanes du Sud-Ouest de Madagascar. Mémoires ORSTOM 1973-n° 68, 235 p.
- P. Morat, J. Koechlin et J.-L. Guillaumet, Flore et Végétation de Madagascar, Flora et Vegetatio Mundi. R. Tüxen. Ed. Cramer.1975, 687 p.
- P. Morat, G. Aymonin et J.-C. Jolinon, L’Herbier du Monde. Cinq siècles d’aventures et de passions botaniques au Muséum national d’histoire naturelle, Editions du Muséum / Les Arènes/ L’Iconoclaste, 2004, 240 p.
