= Spur (botany) =

The botanical term “spur” is given to outgrowths of tissue on different plant organs. The most common usage of the term in botany refers to nectar spurs in flowers.

- nectar spur
- spur (stem)
- spur (leaf)

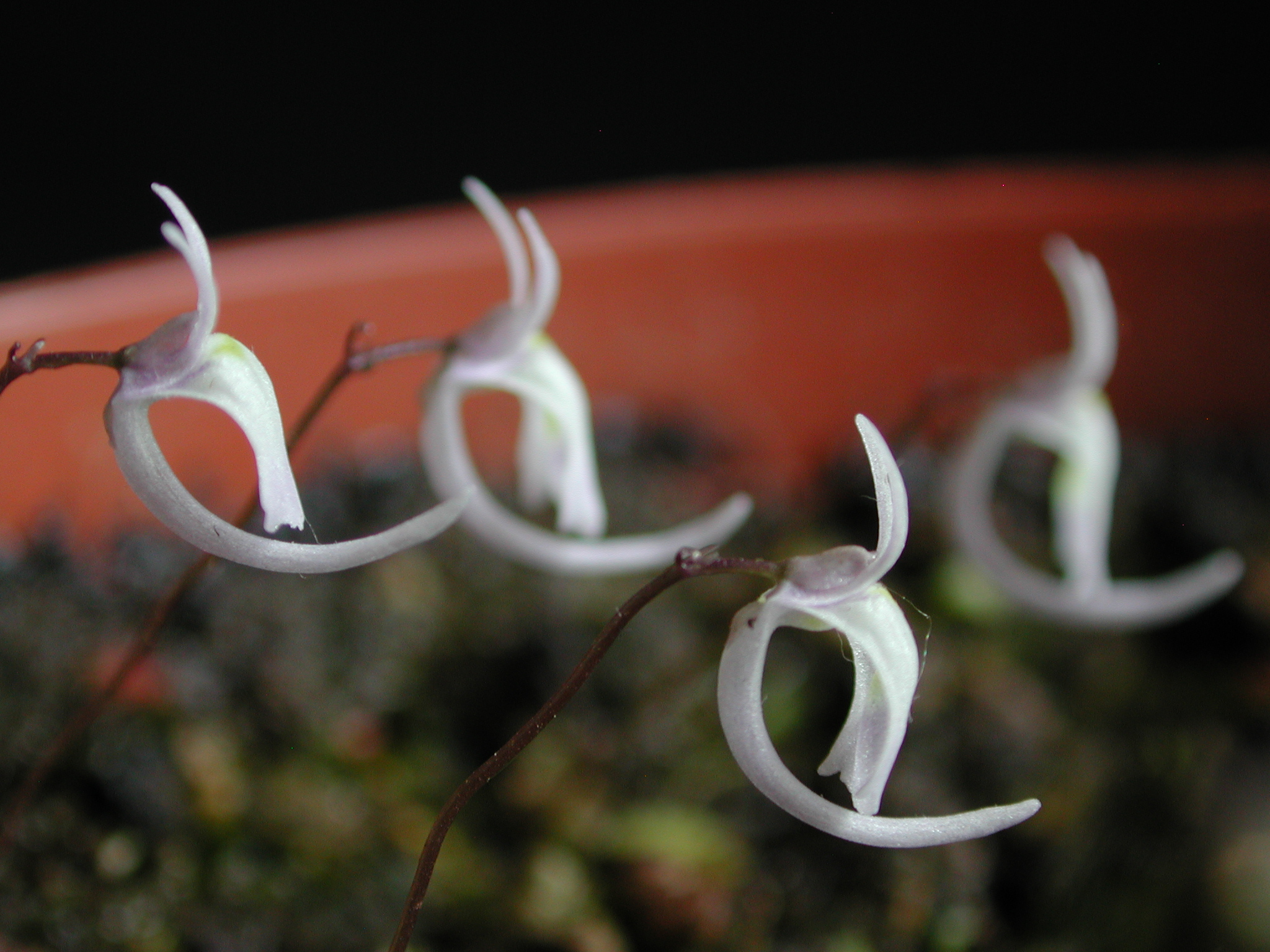
Flowers of Utricularia sandersonii, displaying large floral spurs.

== See also ==
- Fascicle
- Sepal
- Petal
- Tepal
- Calyx
- Corolla
