= Jean Marie Bosser =

French botanist and agricultural engineer

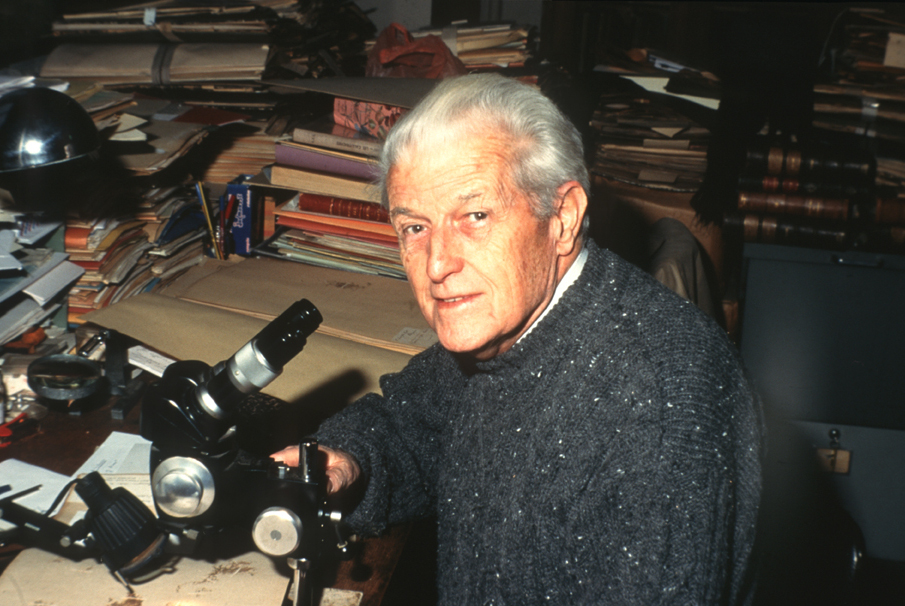
- Born: 23 December 1922
- Died: 6 December 2013 (aged 90)

Jean Marie Bosser (23 December 1922 – 6 December 2013), sometimes listed as Jean-Michel Bosser was a French botanist and agricultural engineer who worked extensively in Madagascar and Mauritius.

Bosser was a researcher at the Laboratoire de Phanérogamie at the Muséum national d'histoire naturelle in Paris. From 1962 to 1963 he was the director of ORSTOM (Office de la recherche scientifique et technique outre-mer, now Institut de recherche pour le développement) in Antananarivo, Madagascar. Together with Thérésien Cadet and Joseph Guého he contributed to the series Flore des Mascareignes published by the Institut de recherche pour le développement (IRD), the Mauritius Sugar Industry Research Institute (MSIRI), and the Royal Botanic Gardens, Kew since 1976 and is a comprehensive work on the flora of Mauritius, Réunion, and Rodrigues. Bosser described numerous new species from Madagascar and the Mascarenes, such as Bulbophyllum labatii, Cynanchum staubii and Cynanchum guehoi. As of June 2014 the International Plant Names Index (IPNI) lists 318 taxa (including many orchids) described by Bosser either as sole author or as a co-author.

== Publications (selected) ==
- 2000. Contribution à l'étude des Orchidaceae de Madagascar et des Mascareignes. XXIX. Révision de la section Kainochilus du genre Bulbophyllum. Adansonia 22(2) 167–182 pdf online
- 2000. Bosser JM; D Florens. Syzygium guehoi ( Myrtaceae ), nouvelle espèce de l'île Maurice. Adansonia 22(2) 183–186 pdf online
- 2001. Bosser JM; P Cribb. Trois nouvelles espèces de Bulbophyllum ( Orchidaceae ) de Madagascar. Adansonia 23(1) 129–135 pdf online
- 2002. Bosser JM. Contribution à l'étude des Orchidaceae de Madagascar, des Comores et des Mascareignes. XXXII. Un Cynorkis nouveau des Comores et un Eulophia nouveau de La Réunion. Adansonia 24(1) 21–25 pdf online
- 2002. la Croix, I; JM Bosser; PJ Cribb. The genus Disperis ( Orchidaceae ) in Madagascar, the Comores, the Mascarenes & the Seychelles . Adansonia 24(1) 55–87 pdf online
- 2002. Bosser JM. Une nouvelle espèce de Turraea ( Meliaceae ) des Mascareignes. Localisation de T. thouarsiana et identité de T. casimiriana . Adansonia 24(1) 113–116 pdf online
- 2002. Bosser JM; J Guého. Deux nouvelles espèces de Pandanus ( Pandanaceae ) de l'île Maurice. Adansonia 24(2) 239–242 pdf online[
- 2003. Bosser JM; PJ Cribb. Contribution à l'étude des Orchidaceae de Madagascar, des Comores et des Mascareignes. XXXIV. Bathiorchis, nouveau genre monotypique de Madagascar. Adansonia 25(2) 229–231 pdf online
- 2004. Bosser, JM. Contribution à l'étude des Orchidaceae de Madagascar, des Comores et des Mascareignes. XXXIII Adansonia 26(1) 53–61 pdf online
- 2005. Bosser, JM; R Rabevohitra. Espèces nouvelles dans le genre Dalbergia (Fabaceae, Papilionoideae) à Madagascar. Adansonia 27(2) 209–216 pdf online
- 2006. Bosser, JM. Contribution à l'étude des Orchidaceae de Madagascar, des Comores et des Mascareignes. XXXV. Description d'un Oeceoclades nouveau de Madagascar, et notes sur trois genres nouveaux pour les Mascareignes. Adansonia 28(1) 45–54 pdf online
- 2012. Baider, C; FBV Florens; F Rakotoarivelo; J Bosser; T. Pailler. Two new records of Jumellea (Orchidaceae) for Mauritius (Mascarene Islands) and its conservation status. Phytotaxa 52: 21–28 abstract online

=== Books ===
- 2007. Hermans, J; C Hermans; D Du Puy; P Cribb; JM Bosser. Orchids of Madagascar. Ed. Royal Botanic Kew 398 pp. ISBN 1-84246-133-8

== Dedicated species ==
- (Acanthaceae) Anisostachya bosseri Benoist
- (Aizoaceae) Delosperma bosserianum Marais
- (Asphodelaceae) Aloe bosseri J.-B.Castillon
- (Arecaceae) Dypsis bosseri J.Dransf. (long known only by the holotype collected by Bosser in December 1962 until its rediscovery in 1999)
- (Asclepiadaceae) Ceropegia bosseri Rauh & Buchloh
- (Asclepiadaceae) Secamone bosseri Klack.
- (Begoniaceae) Begonia bosseri Keraudren
- (Boraginaceae) Hilsenbergia bosseri J.S.Mill.
- (Cucurbitaceae) Ampelosicyos bosseri (Keraudren) H.Schaef. & S.S.Renner
- (Cyperaceae) Trichoschoenus bosseri J.Raynal
- (Dioscoreaceae) Dioscorea bosseri Haigh & Wilkin
- (Ericaceae) Erica bosseri Dorr
- (Eriocaulaceae) Paepalanthus bosseri (Morat) T.Stützel
- (Euphorbiaceae) Euphorbia bosseri Leandri
- (Lamiaceae) Clerodendrum bosseri Capuron
- (Lamiaceae) Plectranthus bosseri Hedge
- (Leguminosae) Crotalaria bosseri M.Peltier
- (Leguminosae) Indigofera bosseri Du Puy & Labat
- (Menyanthaceae) Nymphoides bosseri A.Raynal
- (Monimiaceae) Tambourissa bosseri Jérémie & Lorence
- (Montiniaceae) Grevea bosseri Letouzey
- (Myrtaceae) Eugenia bosseri J.Guého & A.J.Scott
- (Orchidaceae) Angraecum bosseri Senghas
- (Orchidaceae) Bilabrella bosseriana (Szlach. & Olszewski) Szlach. & Kras-Lap.
- (Orchidaceae) Bulbophyllum bosseri K.Lemcke
- (Orchidaceae) Disperis bosseri la Croix & P.J.Cribb
- (Orchidaceae) Jumellea bosseri Pailler
- (Portulacaceae) Talinella bosseri Appleq.
- (Pteridaceae) Pteris bosseri (Tardieu) Christenh.
- (Rubiaceae) Canthium bosseri Cavaco
- (Rubiaceae) Chassalia bosseri Verdc.
- (Rubiaceae) Peponidium bosseri (Cavaco) Razafim., Lantz & B.Bremer
- (Sterculiaceae) Acropogon bosseri Morat & Chalopin
- (Vitaceae) Cissus bosseri Desc.
