= V. S. Summerhayes =

English botanist (1897–1974)

- Born: Victor Samuel Summerhayes; 21 February 1897; Street, England
- Died: 27 December 1973 (aged 76)
- Occupation: Botanist
- Known for: Study of Orchids
- Scientific career
- Author abbrev. (botany): Summerh.

Victor Samuel Summerhayes OBE (21 February 1897 – 27 December 1974) was an English botanist in charge of the orchid herbarium at Royal Botanical Gardens, Kew for 39 years.

Summerhayes was born on 21 February 1897 at Street, Somerset and he was educated at Sexey's School, Bruton and University College, London. His time at University was interrupted by World War I, when he served in the Royal Engineers including action at the Battle of the Somme. In 1920 after being awarded a first-class honours degree, he was awarded the Quain Studentship.

Summerhayes participated in the 1921 Oxford University Spitsbergen expedition, one of the first Oxford Expeditions to Svalbard, together with Julian Huxley and others. He started work at the Herbarium at Kew in 1924.

Summerhayes retired from the Royal Botanical Gardens in 1964 and moved to Sidmouth where he lived until his death in 1974.
