= Peter Taylor (botanist) =

British botanist

- Born: 1926
- Died: 2011 (aged 84–85)
- Scientific career
- Fields: Botany
- Author abbrev. (botany): P.Taylor

Peter Geoffrey Taylor (1926–2011) was a British botanist who worked at Royal Botanic Gardens, Kew throughout his career in botany. Taylor was born in 1926 and joined the staff of the herbarium at Kew in 1948. He published his first new species, Utricularia pentadactyla, in 1954. In 1973, Taylor was appointed curator of the orchid division of the herbarium and, according to Kew, "under his direction, orchid taxonomy was revitalised and its horticultural contacts strengthened."

One of Taylor's main botanical focuses was the genus Utricularia. He authored many species in the genus and provided the most comprehensive monograph on the genus in 1986 and revised in 1989 as The genus Utricularia - a taxonomic monograph. The bladderworts Utricularia petertaylorii and Utricularia tayloriana are named in his honour, as are Acacia taylorii, Chaetopoa taylorii, Genlisea taylorii, Indigofera taylorii, Karina tayloriana, Platystele taylorii, Phyllanthus taylorianus, and Spermacoce taylorii. Genlisea subgen. Tayloria (and by extension Genlisea sect. Tayloria) are also named after him.
