= Leslie Andrew Garay =

Hungarian-born U.S. botanist (1924–2016)

Leslie Andrew Garay (August 6, 1924 – August 19, 2016), born Garay László András, was an American botanist. He was the curator of the Oakes Ames Orchid Herbarium at Harvard University, where he succeeded Charles Schweinfurth in 1958. In 1957 he was awarded a Guggenheim Fellowship.

== Life and work ==
Garay was born in Hungary, and after the Second World War he emigrated first to Canada and then to the United States. He was a taxonomist and collector of orchids, particularly interested in the orchids of tropical America and Southeast Asia.

His ideas were influential in orchid taxonomy, and he reorganized several genera, including Oncidium. In addition to reclassification of various species into different genera, he defined a number of new genera including Chaubardiella in 1969 and Amesiella in 1972.

== Publications ==
Among his influential publications were:

- Venezuelan Orchids Illustrated, Galfrid C. K. Dunsterville & Leslie A. Garay, Andre Deutsch, London & Amsterdam, 1959–76, 334 pp. ISBN 0233964118
- Natural & artificial hybrid generic names of orchids, 1887–1965, 1966, Botanical Museum leaflets, Harvard University, 212 pp.
- Flora of the Lesser Antilles: Orchidaceae , 1974, Garay, Los Angeles, HR Sweet, Amer Orchid Soc. ISBN 99941-1-617-7
- Orchids of the Southern Ryukyu Islands, 1974, Leslie A. Garay & Herman R. Sweet, Botanical Museum, Harvard University, 180 pp.
- Orchidaceae, Cypripedioideae, Orchidoideae, Neottioideae, vol. 9 of Flora of Ecuador, NFR, 304 pp.
- Orchids Venezuela, Galfrid C. K. Dunsterville & Leslie A. Garay, 3 volumes, 1979, Publ. Oakes Ames Orchid Herbarium of the Botanical Museum of Harvard University. Cambridge, Massachusetts
- Systematics of the genus Stelis SW, 1979, Harvard University, Botanical Museum leaflets, 259 pp.
- Index to the orchid herbarium of Oakes Ames in the Botanical Museum of Harvard University, 1989, Chadwyck-Healey, 204 pp. ISBN 0-89887-080-1

== Legacy ==
The following plants have been named in his honour:

Genera

- (Orchidaceae) Garayanthus Szlach.
- (Orchidaceae) Garaya Szlach.
- (Orchidaceae) Lesliea Seidenf.

Species

- (Orchidaceae) Apatostelis garayi Dunst.
- (Orchidaceae) Ascocentrum garayi Christenson, 1992
- (Orchidaceae) Brassia garayana M.W.Chase
- (Orchidaceae) Cranichis garayana Dodson & R.Vásquez
- (Orchidaceae) Dendrobium garayanum A.D.Hawkes & A.H.Heller
- (Orchidaceae) Diaphananthe garayana Szlach. & Olszewski
- (Orchidaceae) Epidendrum garayi Lojtnant
- (Orchidaceae) Gongora garayana R.Rice
- (Orchidaceae) Habenaria garayana Szlach. & Olszewski
- (Orchidaceae) Lepanthes garayi T.Hashim.
- (Orchidaceae) Maxillaria garayi D.E.Benn. & Christenson
- (Orchidaceae) Otoglossum garayanum Szlach. & Kolan.
- (Orchidaceae) Pabstiella garayi (Pabst) Luer
- (Orchidaceae) Schiedeella garayana R.González
- (Orchidaceae) Schlimia garayana H.R.Sweet
- (Orchidaceae) Stelis garayi (Dunst.) Carnevali & I.Ramírez
- (Orchidaceae) Stigmatosema garayanum Szlach.
- (Orchidaceae) Sutrina garayi Senghas
