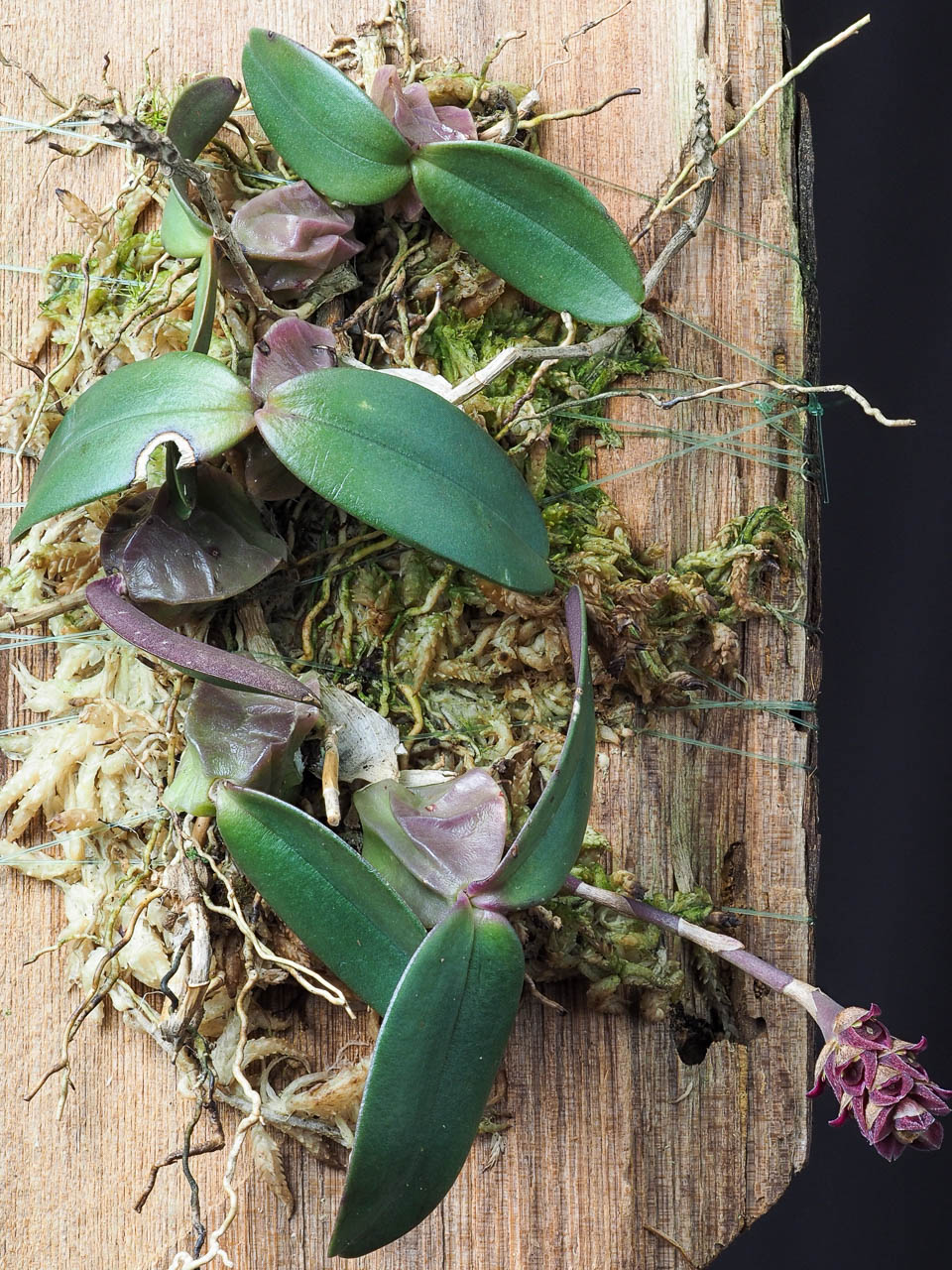
- Bulbophyllum aggregatum

Scientific classification
- Kingdom: Plantae
- Clade: Tracheophytes
- Clade: Angiosperms
- Clade: Monocots
- Order: Asparagales
- Family: Orchidaceae
- Subfamily: Epidendroideae
- Genus: Bulbophyllum
- Section: Bulbophyllum sect. Ploiarium; Schltr. 1925

Type species
- Bulbophyllum coriophorum

Species
- See text

Synonyms
- Bulbophyllum sect. Loxosepalum Schlechter. 1925; Bulbophyllum sect. Lyperostachys H.Perrier; Bulbophyllum sect. Lyraea [Lindl.] Moore 1877

= Bulbophyllum sect. Ploiarium =

Section of flowering plants

Bulbophyllum sect. Ploiarium is a section of the genus Bulbophyllum.

== Description ==
Species in this section are medium to large plants with 2 leaved pseudobulb with an inflorescence carrying many flowers.

== Distribution ==
Plants from this section are found in Madagascar.

== Species ==
Bulbophyllum section Ploiarium comprises the following species:

Image	Name	Distribution	Elevation (m)
	Bulbophyllum abbreviatum Schlechter 1924	Madagascar	500–1,000 metres (1,600–3,300 ft)
	Bulbophyllum acutispicatum H.Perrier 1951	Madagascar	1,500–1,700 metres (4,900–5,600 ft)
	Bulbophyllum aggregatum Bosser 1965	Madagascar	1,300–1,700 metres (4,300–5,600 ft)
	Bulbophyllum alleizettei Schltr. 1922	Madagascar	1,300–1,700 metres (4,300–5,600 ft)
	Bulbophyllum ambatoavense Bosser 2004	Madagascar	700 metres (2,300 ft)
	Bulbophyllum ambrense H.Perrier 1937	Madagascar	1,200 metres (3,900 ft)
	Bulbophyllum amoenum Bosser 1965	Madagascar	1,300–1,400 metres (4,300–4,600 ft)
	Bulbophyllum antongilense Schltr. 1924	Madagascar	500 metres (1,600 ft)
	Bulbophyllum ankaizinense (Jum. & H. Perrier) Schltr. 1924	Madagascar	600–2,000 metres (2,000–6,600 ft)
	Bulbophyllum ankaratranum Schltr. 1924	Madagascar	1,700–2,000 metres (5,600–6,600 ft)
	Bulbophyllum approximatum Ridl. 1882	Madagascar	
	Bulbophyllum auriflorum H.Perrier 1937	Madagascar	400–800 metres (1,300–2,600 ft)
	Bulbophyllum baronii Ridl. 1885	Madagascar	720–2,200 metres (2,360–7,220 ft)
	Bulbophyllum brachyphyton Schltr. 1918	Madagascar	0–300 metres (0–984 ft)
	Bulbophyllum callosum Bosser 1965	Madagascar	1,300–1,400 metres (4,300–4,600 ft)
	Bulbophyllum ceriodorum Boiteau 1942	Madagascar	
	Bulbophyllum clavatum Thouars 1822	Mascarenes and Reunion	
	Bulbophyllum cordemoyi Frapp. 1895	Mascarenes and Reunion	
	Bulbophyllum coccinatum H.Perrier 1938	Madagascar	0–110 metres (0–361 ft)
	Bulbophyllum comorianum H. Perrier 1938	Comoros	
	Bulbophyllum conicum Thouars 1822	Reunion	300–1,000 metres (980–3,280 ft)
	Bulbophyllum coriophorum Ridl. 1886	Madagascar and the Comoros Islands	1,000–2,000 metres (3,300–6,600 ft)
	Bulbophyllum crassipetalum H.Perrier 1937	Madagascar	400–600 metres (1,300–2,000 ft)
	Bulbophyllum curvifolium Schltr. 1916	Madagascar	500–600 metres (1,600–2,000 ft)
	Bulbophyllum cyclanthum Schltr. 1916	Madagascar	1,300 metres (4,300 ft)
	Bulbophyllum decaryanum H. Perrier 1937	Madagascar	900–1,000 metres (3,000–3,300 ft)
	Bulbophyllum divaricatum H.Perrier 1937	Madagascar	1,500–2,000 metres (4,900–6,600 ft)
	Bulbophyllum erythrostachyum Rolfe 1903	Madagascar	
	Bulbophyllum ferkoanum Schltr. 1918	Madagascar	
	Bulbophyllum florulentum Schltr. 1924	Madagascar	1,500–2,000 metres (4,900–6,600 ft)
	Bulbophyllum geminiflorum Hermans, Gamisch & Sieder 2021	Madagascar (Toamasina )	900–950 metres (2,950–3,120 ft)
	Bulbophyllum henrici Schlechter 1925	Madagascar	700–1,700 metres (2,300–5,600 ft)
	Bulbophyllum hirsutiusculum H.Perrier 1937	Madagascar	1,000–1,700 metres (3,300–5,600 ft)
	Bulbophyllum hovarum Schlechter 1924	Madagascar	1,000–2,000 metres (3,300–6,600 ft)
	Bulbophyllum humbertii Schltr. 1922	Madagascar	1,700 metres (5,600 ft)
	Bulbophyllum incurvum Thouars 1822	Madagascar, Mauritius, Rodrigues and Reunion	200–1,000 metres (660–3,280 ft)
	Bulbophyllum insolitum Bosser 1971	Madagascar	
	Bulbophyllum jackyi G.A.Fisch., Sieder & P.J.Cribb 2007	Madagascar	0–100 metres (0–328 ft)
	Bulbophyllum kainochiloides H. Perrier 1937	Madagascar (Mandraka)	
	Bulbophyllum labatii Bosser 2004	Madagascar	200 metres (660 ft)
	Bulbophyllum leandrianum H. Perrier 1937	Madagascar	900 metres (3,000 ft)
	Bulbophyllum lemuraeoides H.Perrier 1937	Madagascar	800–2,000 metres (2,600–6,600 ft)
	Bulbophyllum leonii Kraenzl. 1900	Madagascar	
	Bulbophyllum leptochlamys Schltr. 1924	Madagascar	1,500 metres (4,900 ft)
	Bulbophyllum leptostachyum Schltr. 1922	Madagascar	
	Bulbophyllum lineariligulatum Schltr. 1924	Madagascar	1,000–2,000 metres (3,300–6,600 ft)
	Bulbophyllum lucidum Schltr. 1924	Madagascar	
	Bulbophyllum lyperostachyum Schltr. 1924	Madagascar	2,000 metres (6,600 ft)
	Bulbophyllum marojejiense H.Perrier 1951	Madagascar	1,000–1,600 metres (3,300–5,200 ft)
	Bulbophyllum marovoense H.Perrier 1951	Madagascar	
	Bulbophyllum masoalanum Schltr. 1916	Madagascar	300 metres (980 ft)
	Bulbophyllum megalonyx Rchb.f. 1881	Madagascar	1,000–1,500 metres (3,300–4,900 ft)
	Bulbophyllum melleum H.Perrier 1937	Madagascar	1,000–1,400 metres (3,300–4,600 ft)
	Bulbophyllum minax Schltr. 1924	Madagascar	1,300–2,000 metres (4,300–6,600 ft)
	Bulbophyllum minutilabrum H.Perrier 1937	Madagascar (Maromokotro)	2,400 metres (7,900 ft)
	Bulbophyllum moramanganum Schltr 1922	Madagascar	100–1,300 metres (330–4,270 ft)
	Bulbophyllum multiflorum Ridl. 1885	Madagascar	900–1,500 metres (3,000–4,900 ft)
	Bulbophyllum myrmecochilum Schltr 1925	Madagascar	2,000 metres (6,600 ft)
	Bulbophyllum namoronae Bosser 1971	Madagascar	900–1,100 metres (3,000–3,600 ft)
	Bulbophyllum nitens Jum. & H.Perrier 1912	Madagascar	1,000–2,000 metres (3,300–6,600 ft)
	Bulbophyllum oenanthum Hermans, G.A.Fisch. & Andriant 2021	Madagascar (Toamasina)	0 metres (0 ft)
	Bulbophyllum ophiuchus Ridl. 1912	Madagascar	900–1,400 metres (3,000–4,600 ft)
	Bulbophyllum oreodorum Schltr. 1924	Madagascar	2,000–2,400 metres (6,600–7,900 ft)
	Bulbophyllum pallens (Jum. & H.Perrier) Schltr. 1924	Madagascar	1,000 metres (3,300 ft)
	Bulbophyllum paleiferum Schltr. 1924	Madagascar	500–900 metres (1,600–3,000 ft)
	Bulbophyllum papangense H.Perrier 1937	Madagascar	1,500 metres (4,900 ft)
	Bulbophyllum perreflexum Bosser & P.J.Cribb 2001	Madagascar	900–1,300 metres (3,000–4,300 ft)
	Bulbophyllum perseverans Hermans 2007	Madagascar	2,000 metres (6,600 ft)
	Bulbophyllum peyrotii Bosser 1965	Madagascar	900–1,000 metres (3,000–3,300 ft)
	Bulbophyllum platypodum H.Perrier 1937	Madagascar	400–1,200 metres (1,300–3,900 ft)
	Bulbophyllum pleiopterum Schltr. 1912	Madagascar	300 metres (980 ft)
	Bulbophyllum prismaticum Thouars 1822	Reunion	500–900 metres (1,600–3,000 ft)
	Bulbophyllum protectum H.Perrier 1937	Madagascar	700–1,000 metres (2,300–3,300 ft)
	Bulbophyllum quadrialatum H.Perrier 1939	Madagascar	1,800 metres (5,900 ft)
	Bulbophyllum ranomafanae Bosser & P.J. Cribb 2001	Madagascar	950–1,150 metres (3,120–3,770 ft)
	Bulbophyllum reifii Sieder & Kiehn 2009	Madagascar	800–1,600 metres (2,600–5,200 ft)
	Bulbophyllum rhodostachys Schltr. 1916	Madagascar (Masoala)	300 metres (980 ft)
	Bulbophyllum rictorium Schltr. 1925	Madagascar (Tsaratanana)	1,500 metres (4,900 ft)
	Bulbophyllum rienanense H.Perrier 1937	Madagascar	
	Bulbophyllum rubiginosum Schltr. 1925	Madagascar	750–1,150 metres (2,460–3,770 ft)
	Bulbophyllum rubrigemmum Hermans 2007	Madagascar	
	Bulbophyllum rubrolabium Schltr. 1916	Madagascar (Diana)	1,500 metres (4,900 ft)
	Bulbophyllum sanguineum H.Perrier 1937	Madagascar	1,000 metres (3,300 ft)
	Bulbophyllum sarcorhachis Schltr. 1918	Madagascar	0–2,600 metres (0–8,530 ft)
	Bulbophyllum subapproximatum H.Perrier 1937	Madagascar (Manongarivo)	1,000 metres (3,300 ft)
	Bulbophyllum sphaerobulbum H.Perrier 1937	Madagascar	400 metres (1,300 ft)
	Bulbophyllum subclavatum Schltr. 1925	Madagascar	750–1,700 metres (2,460–5,580 ft)
	Bulbophyllum subcrenulatum Schltr.1925	Madagascar	800–1,000 metres (2,600–3,300 ft)
	Bulbophyllum subsecundum Schltr. 1916	Madagascar (Antsiranana)	800 metres (2,600 ft)
	Bulbophyllum subsessile Schltr.1924	Madagascar (Toamasina)	
	Bulbophyllum tampoketsense H.Perrier 1937	Madagascar	
	Bulbophyllum teretibulbum H.Perrier 1937	Madagascar	900–1,000 metres (3,000–3,300 ft)
	Bulbophyllum toilliezae Bosser 1965	Madagascar	900–1,000 metres (3,000–3,300 ft)
	Bulbophyllum trichochlamys H.Perrier 1937	Madagascar	
	Bulbophyllum turkii Bosser & P.J.Cribb 2001	Madagascar	950–1,150 metres (3,120–3,770 ft)
	Bulbophyllum vakonae Hermans 2007	Madagascar	800–900 metres (2,600–3,000 ft)
	Bulbophyllum ventriosum H.Perrier 1937	Madagascar	2,000 metres (6,600 ft)
	Bulbophyllum verruculiferum H.Perrier 1951	Madagascar	1,500–1,700 metres (4,900–5,600 ft)
	Bulbophyllum vulcanorum H.Perrier 1938	Madagascar	1,000 metres (3,300 ft)
	Bulbophyllum xanthobulbum Schltr. 1918	Madagascar	0–1,400 metres (0–4,593 ft)
	Bulbophyllum zaratananae Schltr. 1924	Madagascar	1,600–2,000 metres (5,200–6,600 ft)
