= Bulbophyllum sect. Pantoblepharon =

Scientific classification
- Kingdom: Plantae
- Clade: Tracheophytes
- Clade: Angiosperms
- Clade: Monocots
- Order: Asparagales
- Family: Orchidaceae
- Subfamily: Epidendroideae
- Genus: Bulbophyllum
- Section: Bulbophyllum sect. Pantoblepharon; Schltr. 1925

Type species
- Bulbophyllum pantoblepharon

Species
- See text

Synonyms
- Bulbophyllum sect. Trichopus Schltr. 1925

Section of flowering plants

Bulbophyllum sect. Pantoblepharon is a section of the genus Bulbophyllum.

== Description ==
Species in this section have creeping rhizomes with single leafed pseudobulbs.

== Distribution ==
Plants from this section are found in Madagascar.

== Species ==
Bulbophyllum section Pantoblepharon comprises the following species:

Image	Name	Distribution	Elevation (m)
	Bulbophyllum boiteaui H.Perrier 1939	Madagascar	1,200–2,000 metres (3,900–6,600 ft)
	Bulbophyllum bryophilum Hermans 2007	Madagascar	
	Bulbophyllum calyptropus Schltr. 1924	Madagascar	1,000–2,000 metres (3,300–6,600 ft)
	Bulbophyllum ciliatilabrum H.Perrier 1937	Madagascar	800 metres (2,600 ft)
	Bulbophyllum conchidioides Ridl.1885	Madagascar	900–1,400 metres (3,000–4,600 ft)
	Bulbophyllum discilabium H.Perrier 1951	Madagascar	960–2,000 metres (3,150–6,560 ft)
	Bulbophyllum histrionicum Rchb.f. ex G.A.Fisch. & P.J.Cribb 2009	Madagascar	100–350 metres (330–1,150 ft)
	Bulbophyllum hyalinum Schltr. 1924	Madagascar	400–1,200 metres (1,300–3,900 ft)
	Bulbophyllum jumelleanum Schltr. 1913	Madagascar	1,200 metres (3,900 ft)
	Bulbophyllum latipetalum H.Perrier 1951	Madagascar	1,700–1,850 metres (5,580–6,070 ft)
	Bulbophyllum maudeae A.D.Hawkes 1966	Madagascar	1,500–1,700 metres (4,900–5,600 ft)
	Bulbophyllum nigriflorum H.Perrier 1937	Madagascar	1,000 metres (3,300 ft)
	Bulbophyllum obscuriflorum H.Perrier 1937	Madagascar	400 metres (1,300 ft)
	Bulbophyllum onivense H. Perrier 1937	Madagascar	1,000–1,500 metres (3,300–4,900 ft)
	Bulbophyllum pantoblepharon Schltr. 1924	Madagascar	1,600 metres (5,200 ft)
	Bulbophyllum pervillei Rolfe 1891	Madagascar	0–1,000 metres (0–3,281 ft)
	Bulbophyllum pleurothallopsis Schltr. 1925	Madagascar	1,000–1,600 metres (3,300–5,200 ft)
	Bulbophyllum sciaphile Bosser 1965	Madagascar	1,300–1,400 metres (4,300–4,600 ft)
