= Bulbophyllum sect. Lichenophylax =

Scientific classification
- Kingdom: Plantae
- Clade: Tracheophytes
- Clade: Angiosperms
- Clade: Monocots
- Order: Asparagales
- Family: Orchidaceae
- Subfamily: Epidendroideae
- Genus: Bulbophyllum
- Section: Bulbophyllum sect. Lichenophylax; Schltr. 1924

Type species
- Bulbophyllum lichenophylax

Species
- See text

Section of flowering plants

Bulbophyllum sect. Lichenophylax is a section of the genus Bulbophyllum.

== Description ==
Species in this section have creeping rhizome with tubular sheaths and small pseudobulbs.

== Distribution ==
Plants from this section are found in Madagascar.

== Species ==
Bulbophyllum section Lichenophylax comprises the following species:

Image	Name	Distribution	Elevation (m)
	Bulbophyllum afzelii Schltr. 1918	Madagascar	800–1,400 metres (2,600–4,600 ft)
	Bulbophyllum bryophytoides G.A.Fisch. & Andriant. 2009	Madagascar (Toamasina)	600–1,000 metres (2,000–3,300 ft)
	Bulbophyllum cataractarum Schltr. 1924	Madagascar	1,200 metres (3,900 ft)
	Bulbophyllum debile Bosser 1989 publ. 1990	Madagascar	900–1,000 metres (3,000–3,300 ft)
	Bulbophyllum forsythianum Kraenzl. 1900	Madagascar	300–1,400 metres (980–4,590 ft)
	Bulbophyllum hapalanthos Garay 1999	Madagascar	
	Bulbophyllum lakatoense Bosser 1969	Madagascar	1,000–1,100 metres (3,300–3,600 ft)
	Bulbophyllum lanterna Hermans 2021	Madagascar (Mangoro (Toamasina) and Sava (Antsiranana))	1,000–1,150 metres (3,280–3,770 ft)
	Bulbophyllum lichenophylax Schltr. 1924	Madagascar	800–2,000 metres (2,600–6,600 ft)
	Bulbophyllum mangenotii Bosser 1965	Madagascar	1,200–2,100 metres (3,900–6,900 ft)
	Bulbophyllum neglectum Bosser 1965	Madagascar	800–1,000 metres (2,600–3,300 ft)
	Bulbophyllum percoroiculatum H.Perrier 1951	Madagascar	600 metres (2,000 ft)
	Bulbophyllum perpusillum H.Wendl. & Kraenzl. 1894	Madagascar	100–240 metres (330–790 ft)
	Bulbophyllum rudolphus Hermans 2021	Madagascar (Toamasina)	1,150 metres (3,770 ft)
