= List of endemic plants of the Comoros =

The Comoro Islands are an island group in the western Indian Ocean which are home to dozens endemic plants.

The World Geographical Scheme for Recording Plant Distributions (WGSRPD) treats the islands as a single botanical country although the islands are politically divided. The islands of Grand Comore, Anjouan, and Mohéli comprise the Union of the Comoros, an independent republic, while the eastern island of Mayotte is an overseas department of France.

Plants are listed alphabetically by plant family. Plants endemic to specific islands are indicated.

== Acanthaceae ==
- Anisostachya humblotii Benoist – Comoros
- Anisostachya paucinervis Benoist – Comoros
- Anisotes comorensis (Lindau) T.F.Daniel – Comoros
- Anisotes mayottensis T.F.Daniel – Mayotte
- Barleria comorensis Lindau – Comoros
- Hypoestes comorensis Baker – Comoros
- Hypoestes fastuosa (L.) Sol. ex Roem. & Schult. – Comoros
- Isoglossa comorensis Lindau – Comoros
- Justicia johannae Benoist – Comoros
- Justicia keriana Sweet – Comoros
- Justicia paucinervis Benoist – Comoros

== Achariaceae ==
- Erythrospermum sifarii Hul, Labat & O.Pascal – Mayotte

== Amaranthaceae ==
- Lagrezia comorensis Cavaco – Mayotte

== Amaryllidaceae ==
- Crinum hildebrandtii Vatke – Comoros

== Annonaceae ==
- Huberantha humblotii (Drake ex Cavaco & Keraudren) Chaowasku – Comoros
- Monanthotaxis komorensis P.H.Hoekstra – Comoros

== Apocynaceae ==
- Ceropegia mayottae H.Huber – Comoros
- Cynanchum comorense Choux – Comoros
- Marsdenia mayottae W.D.Stevens, Labat & F.Barthelat – Mayotte

== Araliaceae ==
- Polyscias felicis Bernardi – Comoros
- Polyscias mayottensis Lowry, O.Pascal & Labat – Mayotte

== Arecaceae ==
- Chrysalidocarpus cabadae H.E.Moore – Mayotte
- Chrysalidocarpus humblotianus (Baill.) Becc. – Anjouan
- Chrysalidocarpus lanceolatus Becc. – Comoros
- Ravenea hildebrandtii H.Wendl. ex C.D.Bouché – Comoros
- Ravenea moorei J.Dransf. & N.W.Uhl – Anjouan

== Asparagaceae ==
- Dracaena kirkii Baker – Comoros

== Asphodelaceae ==
- Aloe alexandrei Ellert – western Grand Comore and Mayotte
- Aloe mayottensis A.Berger – Mayotte

== Aspleniaceae ==
- Asplenium karthalense Viane – Comoros
- Thelypteris comorensis (Holttum) Christenh. – Comoros
- Thelypteris johannae (Holttum) Christenh. – Comoros

== Asteraceae ==
- Brachylaena ramiflora var. comorensis Humbert – Comoros
- Helichrysum humblotii Klatt – Comoros
- Helichrysum ochraceum Klatt – Comoros
- Hubertia foliatilis (S.Moore) C.Jeffrey – Comoros
- Hubertia humblotii (Klatt) C.Jeffrey – Comoros
- Psiadia pascalii Labat & Beentje – Mayotte
- Vernonia diversifolia subsp. bechioides (Klatt) Humbert – Comoros

== Balsaminaceae ==
- Impatiens auricoma Baill. – Comoros
- Impatiens comorensis Baker – Comoros
- Impatiens wibkeae Eb.Fisch. & Raheliv. – Comoros

== Begoniaceae ==
- Begonia anjuanensis Humbert ex Aymonin & Bosser – Comoros
- Begonia comorensis Warb. – Comoros

== Bignoniaceae ==
- Colea comorensis (H.Perrier) Callm. – Comoros
- Phyllarthron comorense DC. – Comoros

== Burmanniaceae ==
- Gymnosiphon mayottensis Cheek – Mayotte

== Calophyllaceae ==
- Calophyllum comorense H.Perrier – Anjouan and Mayotte

== Capparaceae ==
- Capparis tchaourembensis Fici – Mayotte

== Celastraceae ==
- Elaeodendron anjouanense H.Perrier – Comoros
- Gymnosporia alaternifolia (Tul.) Loes. – Comoros

== Clusiaceae ==
- Garcinia anjouanensis (H.Perrier) P.W.Sweeney & Z.S.Rogers – Comoros

== Crassulaceae ==
- Kalanchoe adelae Raym.-Hamet – Grand Comore

== Cunoniaceae ==
- Pterophylla comorensis (Tul.) J.Bradford & Z.S.Rogers – Comoros

== Cyatheaceae ==
- Alsophila hildebrandtii (Kuhn) R.M.Tryon – Comoros
- Alsophila kirkii (Hook.) R.M.Tryon – Comoros
- Alsophila parahildebrandtii (Janssen & Rakotondr.) ined. – Comoros and Mayotte

== Cyperaceae ==
- Bulbostylis boivinii C.B.Clarke ex Cherm. – Comoros
- Bulbostylis comorensis C.B.Clarke – Comoros

== Dioscoreaceae ==
- Dioscorea comorensis R.Knuth – Comoros
- Dioscorea mayottensis Wilkin – Comoros

== Ebenaceae ==
- Diospyros pascalii Linan, G.E.Schatz & Lowry – Mayotte

== Ericaceae ==
- Erica comorensis (Engl.) Dorr & E.G.H.Oliv. – Comoros
  - Erica comorensis subsp. anjurensis (Alm & T.C.E.Fr.) Dorr & E.G.H.Oliv. – Anjouan
  - Erica comorensis subsp. comorensis – Comoros

== Erythroxylaceae ==
- Erythroxylum choungiense E.Bidault, Traclet & M.Pignal – Mayotte
- Erythroxylum elegans Baill. – Comoros
- Erythroxylum labatii E.Bidault & M.Pignal – Comoros

== Euphorbiaceae ==
- Acalypha berryi I.Montero, Cardiel & G.A.Levin – Mayotte
- Acalypha mayottensis I.Montero & Cardiel – Mayotte
- Acalypha richardiana Baill. – Comoros and Mayotte
- Argomuellera trewioides (Baill.) Pax & K.Hoffm. – Mayotte
- Croton bifurcatus Baill. – Comoros
- Croton emeliae Baill. – Mayotte
- Croton humblotii Baill. – Comoros
- Croton mayottae P.E.Berry & Kainul. – Mayotte
- Macaranga bailloniana Müll.Arg. – Comoros and Mayotte
- Micrococca humblotiana (Baill.) Prain – Comoros
- Suregada comorensis Baill. – Comoros

== Fabaceae ==
- Cassia johannae Vatke – Comoros
- Cynometra floretii Labat & O.Pascal – Mayotte
- Cynometra mayottensis Labat & O.Pascal – Mayotte
- Dalbergia comorensis Bosser & R.Rabev – Comoros

== Gesneriaceae ==
- Streptocarpus plantaginea Vatke – Comoros

== Hamamelidaceae ==
- Dicoryphe platyphylla Tul. – Mayotte

== Hymenophyllaceae ==
- Trichomanes hildebrandtii Kuhn – Anjouan and Mayotte
- Trichomanes kirkii Hook. – Comoros

== Iridaceae ==
- Geosiris albiflora Goldblatt & J.C.Manning – Mayotte

== Lauraceae ==
- Ocotea comoriensis Kosterm. – Comoros

== Lecythidaceae ==
- Foetidia comorensis Labat, E.Bidault & Viscardi – Mayotte

== Linaceae ==
- Hugonia johannensis H.Perrier – Comoros

== Malvaceae ==
- Dombeya polyphylla K.Schum. – Comoros
- Grewia comorensis Bojer – Comoros
- Grewia pamanziana R.Vig. – Comoros
- Hibiscus comorensis Baill. – Mayotte
- Nesogordonia suzannae Labat, Munzinger & O.Pascal – Mayotte
- Sterculia comorensis Baill. – Comoros
- Sterculia madagascariensis R.Br. – Comoros

== Melastomataceae ==
- Memecylon mayottense R.D.Stone – Mayotte

== Meliaceae ==
- Trichilia humblotii Harms – Comoros

== Menispermaceae ==
- Triclisia capitata (Baill.) Diels – Comoros

== Monimiaceae ==
- Tambourissa comorensis Lorence – Comoros
- Tambourissa kirkii Cavaco – Comoros
- Tambourissa moeheliensis Lorence – Comoros
- Tambourissa paradoxa Perkins – Comoros

== Moraceae ==
- Ficus antandronarum subsp. bernardii C.C.Berg – Comoros
- Ficus karthalensis C.C.Berg – Comoros

== Myricaceae ==
- Myrica dentulata var. comorensis (A.Chev.) J.-F.Leroy – Comoros

== Myrtaceae ==
- Eugenia choungiensis Byng & N.Snow – Mayotte
- Eugenia humblotii Engl. & Brehmer – Comoros
- Eugenia pascaliana Byng, Bernardini & N.Snow – Mayotte
- Syzygium comorense Byng & N.Snow – Comoros
- Syzygium humblotii Labat & Schatz – Mayotte (Combani)
- Syzygium labatii Byng & N.Snow – Mayotte
- Syzygium tringiense Byng & N.Snow – Mayotte

== Ochnaceae ==
- Ochna comorensis Baill. – Comoros

== Olacaceae ==
- Olax mayottensis Z.S.Rogers, Malécot & Sikes – Mayotte

== Oleaceae ==
- Noronhia cochleata Labat, M.Pignal & O.Pascal – Comoros
- Noronhia comorensis S.Moore – Comoros
- Noronhia cordifolia (Labat, M.Pignal & O.Pascal) Hong-Wa & Besnard – Mayotte
- Noronhia insularis (Labat, M.Pignal & O.Pascal) Hong-Wa & Besnard – Comoros
- Noronhia mayottensis (H.Perrier) Hong-Wa & Besnard – Mayotte

== Orchidaceae ==
- Aerangis boutonii (Rchb.f.) P.J.Cribb & Carlsward – Comoros
- Aerangis hariotiana (Kraenzl.) P.J.Cribb & Carlsward – Comoros
- Aerangis hildebrandtii (Rchb.f.) P.J.Cribb & Carlsward – Comoros
- Aerangis humblotii (Rchb.f.) P.J.Cribb & Carlsward – Comoros
- Aeranthes campbelliae Hermans & Bosser – Comoros
- Aeranthes virginalis D.L.Roberts – Comoros
- Angraecopsis pobeguinii (Finet) H.Perrier – Grand Comore
- Angraecum florulentum Rchb.f. – Grand Comore
- Angraecum scottianum Rchb.f. – Comoros
- Angraecum xylopus Rchb.f. – Comoros
- Bulbophyllum comorianum H.Perrier – Grand Comore
- Bulbophyllum leonii Kraenzl. – Comoros
- Bulbophyllum megalonyx Rchb.f. – Anjouan
- Cynorkis comorensis Bosser – Comoros
- Cynorkis humblotiana Kraenzl. – Comoros
- Cynorkis lilacina var. comorensis H.Perrier ex Hermans – Comoros
- Cynorkis parvula Schltr. – Comoros
- Cynorkis schmidtii (Kraenzl.) Schltr. – Comoros
- Cynorkis sigmoidea Kraenzl. – Grand Comore
- Eulophia angornensis (Rchb.f.) P.J.Cribb – Comoros
- Eulophia megistophylla Rchb.f. – Grand Comore
- Habenaria comorensis H.Perrier – Comoros
- Habenaria johannae Kraenzl. – Anjouan
- Habenaria tomentella Rchb.f. – Comoros
- Hetaeria vaginalis Rchb.f. – Comoros
- Jumellea anjouanensis (Finet) H.Perrier – Comoros
- Jumellea comorensis (Rchb.f.) Schltr. – Comoros
- Jumellea pailleri F.Rakotoar. – Grand Comore
- Malaxis cardiophylla (Rchb.f.) Kuntze – Mayotte

== Pandanaceae ==
- Pandanus associatus Huynh – Comoros
- Pandanus maximus Martelli – Comoros
- Pandanus mayotteensis H.St.John – Comoros

== Passifloraceae ==
- Adenia barthelatii M.Pignal, Yockteng, Hearn & Labat – Mayotte

== Phyllanthaceae ==
- Phyllanthus comorensis Leandri – Comoros

== Piperaceae ==
- Peperomia boivinii C.DC. – Comoros
- Peperomia globosibacca C.DC. – Mayotte
- Peperomia schmidtii C.DC. – Comoros
- Piper boivinii C.DC. – Comoros

== Poaceae ==
- Acroceras boivinii (Mez) A.Camus – Comoros
- Agrostis comorensis A.Camus – Comoros
- Cyrtococcum fuscinode (Steud.) A.Camus – Comoros
- Panicum fasciculiforme Mez – Comoros
- Panicum leprosulum Mez – Comoros
- Panicum linoides Steud. – Comoros

== Polypodiaceae ==
- Ctenitis mayottensis Li Bing Zhang & Yi F.Duan – Mayotte
- Ctenitis spekei (Baker) Li Bing Zhang & Yi F.Duan – Comoros
- Dryopteris comorensis (Tardieu) Fraser-Jenk. – Comoros
- Grammitis comorensis (Baker) Christenh. – Comoros

== Primulaceae ==
- Embelia comorensis Mez – Comoros
- Myrsine boivinii (Mez) Ricketson & Pipoly – Mayotte
- Myrsine comorensis (Mez) Ricketson & Pipoly – Comoros
- Oncostemum humblotii Mez – Comoros
- Oncostemum pendulum Mez – Comoros
- Oncostemum racemiferum Mez – Comoros

== Putranjivaceae ==
- Drypetes comorensis (Baill.) Pax & K.Hoffm. – Comoros
- Drypetes darcyana McPherson – Mayotte

== Ranunculaceae ==
- Clematis actinostemmatifolia W.T.Wang – Comoros
- Clematis comoresensis W.T.Wang – Comoros

== Rhizophoraceae ==
- Cassipourea ovata Tul. – Mayotte

== Rubiaceae ==
- Chassalia comorensis Bremek. - Comoros
- Coffea humblotiana Baill. – Anjouan and Mayotte
- Danais comorensis Drake – Mayotte
- Gyrostipula comorensis J.-F.Leroy – Comoros
- Paederia ntiti Mouly & Puff – Comoros
- Paracephaelis comorensis De Block – Comoros
- Pentas lanceolata subsp. cymosa (Klotzsch) Verdc. – Comoros
- Peponidium ovato-oblongum (K.Schum.) Mouly – Mayotte
- Peponidium venulosum (Boivin ex Baill.) Razafim., Lantz & B.Bremer – Comoros
- Polysphaeria lanceolata subsp. comorensis Hiern ex Verdc. – Comoros
- Psychotria anjouanensis A.P.Davis & Govaerts – Comoros
- Psychotria boiviniana (Baill.) Razafim. & B.Bremer – Mayotte
- Psychotria calothyris (Bremek.) A.P.Davis & Govaerts – Comoros
- Psychotria comorensis Bremek. – Comoros
- Psychotria conocarpa Bremek. – Comoros
- Psychotria labatii Razafim. & B.Bremer – Mayotte
- Psychotria lavanchiei Bremek. – Comoros
- Pyrostria anjouanensis Arènes ex Cavaco – Comoros
- Pyrostria heliconioides Mouly – Mayotte
- Saldinia boiviniana (Baill.) Bremek. – Comoros

== Rutaceae ==
- Ivodea mayottensis Labat & M.Pignal – Mayotte
- Ivodea moheliensis M.Pignal & Labat – Comoros
- Vepris darcyi Labat, M.Pignal & O.Pascal – Mayotte
- Vepris parvicalyx H.Perrier – Comoros
- Vepris spathulata (Engl.) H.Perrier – Mayotte

== Salicaceae ==
- Ludia comorensis H.Perrier – Comoros
- Scolopia coriacea Tul. – Comoros
- Scolopia maoulidae Hul, Labat & O.Pascal – Mayotte

== Santalaceae ==
- Korthalsella humblotii (Tiegh.) Engl. – Comoros

== Sapotaceae ==
- Labramia mayottensis Labat, M.Pignal & O.Pascal – Comoros
- Mimusops comorensis Engl. – Comoros

== Solanaceae ==
- Solanum macrothyrsum Dammer – Mayotte

== Stilbaceae ==
- Nuxia pseudodentata Gilg – Comoros

== Thymelaeaceae ==
- Stephanodaphne boivinii Baill. – Mayotte

== Urticaceae ==
- Elatostema madagascariense var. incisum (Wedd.) Leandri – Comoros
- Pouzolzia herpetophyton Friis & Wilmot-Dear – Comoros and Mayotte

== Violaceae ==
- Rinorea calycina (Tul.) Baill. – Mayotte
- Rinorea comorensis Engl. – Comoros

== Vitaceae ==
- Cyphostemma comorense Desc. – Comoros
- Cyphostemma labatii Desc. – Mayotte
