= Oeceoclades analamerensis =

Scientific classification
- Kingdom: Plantae
- Clade: Tracheophytes
- Clade: Angiosperms
- Clade: Monocots
- Order: Asparagales
- Family: Orchidaceae
- Subfamily: Epidendroideae
- Genus: Oeceoclades
- Species: O. analamerensis

Binomial name
- Oeceoclades analamerensis (H.Perrier) Garay & P.Taylor

Synonyms
- Lissochilus analamerensis H.Perrier; Eulophidium analamerense (H.Perrier) Summerh.

Species of orchid

Oeceoclades analamerensis is a terrestrial orchid species in the genus Oeceoclades that is endemic to northern Madagascar. It was first described by the French botanist Joseph Marie Henry Alfred Perrier de la Bâthie in 1939 as Lissochilus analamerensis. The English botanist V.S. Summerhayes later transferred this species to the genus Eulophidium in 1957. When Leslie Andrew Garay and Peter Taylor revised the genus Oeceoclades in 1976, they transferred this species to the expanded Oeceoclades.

Garay and Taylor noted that O. analamerensis is similar in vegetative morphology to O. alismatophylla, but it can be distinguished from similar species by its floral morphology, including the two small lamellae at the base of the labellum and the hairy disc on the labellum.
