= Oeceoclades analavelensis =

Scientific classification
- Kingdom: Plantae
- Clade: Tracheophytes
- Clade: Angiosperms
- Clade: Monocots
- Order: Asparagales
- Family: Orchidaceae
- Subfamily: Epidendroideae
- Genus: Oeceoclades
- Species: O. analavelensis

Binomial name
- Oeceoclades analavelensis (H.Perrier) Garay & P.Taylor

Synonyms
- Lissochilus analavelensis H.Perrier; Eulophidium analavelense (H.Perrier) Summerh.

Species of orchid

Oeceoclades analavelensis is a terrestrial orchid species in the genus Oeceoclades that is endemic to southwestern Madagascar. It was first described by the French botanist Joseph Marie Henry Alfred Perrier de la Bâthie in 1939 as Lissochilus analavelensis. The English botanist V.S. Summerhayes later transferred this species to the genus Eulophidium in 1957. When Leslie Andrew Garay and Peter Taylor revised the genus Oeceoclades in 1976, they transferred this species to the expanded Oeceoclades.

Garay and Taylor noted that O. analavelensis is similar in floral morphology to O. sclerophylla, but the two differ in vegetative morphology.
