= Bulbophyllum abbreviatum =

Scientific classification
- Kingdom: Plantae
- Clade: Tracheophytes
- Clade: Angiosperms
- Clade: Monocots
- Order: Asparagales
- Family: Orchidaceae
- Subfamily: Epidendroideae
- Genus: Bulbophyllum
- Species: B. abbreviatum

Binomial name
- Bulbophyllum abbreviatum Schltr.

Synonyms
- Bulbophyllum abbreviatum Rchb.f 1881; Bulbophyllum trigonopus Rchb.f 1881; Cirrhopetalum abbreviatum Rchb.f 1881; Cirrhopetalum trigonopus Rchb.f 1881; Peltopus greuterianus Szlach. and Marg.; Bulbophyllum ormerodianum Hermans 2007 (nomen superfluum)

Species of orchid from Madagascar

Bulbophyllum abbreviatum is a species of orchid in the genus Bulbophyllum discovered in Madagascar and originally described by German botanist Rudolf Schlechter, from material collected by French botanist H. Perrier de la Bâthie in February 1912, which is now kept in the Muséum National d'Histoire Naturelle in Paris.

The plant is a pseudobulb epiphyte.

== Cirrhopetalum abbreviatum ==
According to Seidenfadden this is a different species from Cirrhopetalum abbreviatum Rchb.f 1881, however other sources disagree, notably the Conference of the Parties to CITES and associated Plants and Nomenclature Committees.

According to the Kew World Checklist of Selected Plant Families, Cirrhopetalum abbreviatum is a synonym of Bulbophyllum trigonopus, of which Bulbophyllum abbreviatum (Rchb.f.) Rchb.f. ex Seidenf. as used in Dansk Bot. Ark. 29(1): 73 (1973) is a nomen illegitimum. This is not accepted by the Kew World Checklist of Monocotyledons Database and the World Checklist of Seed Plants 3.
