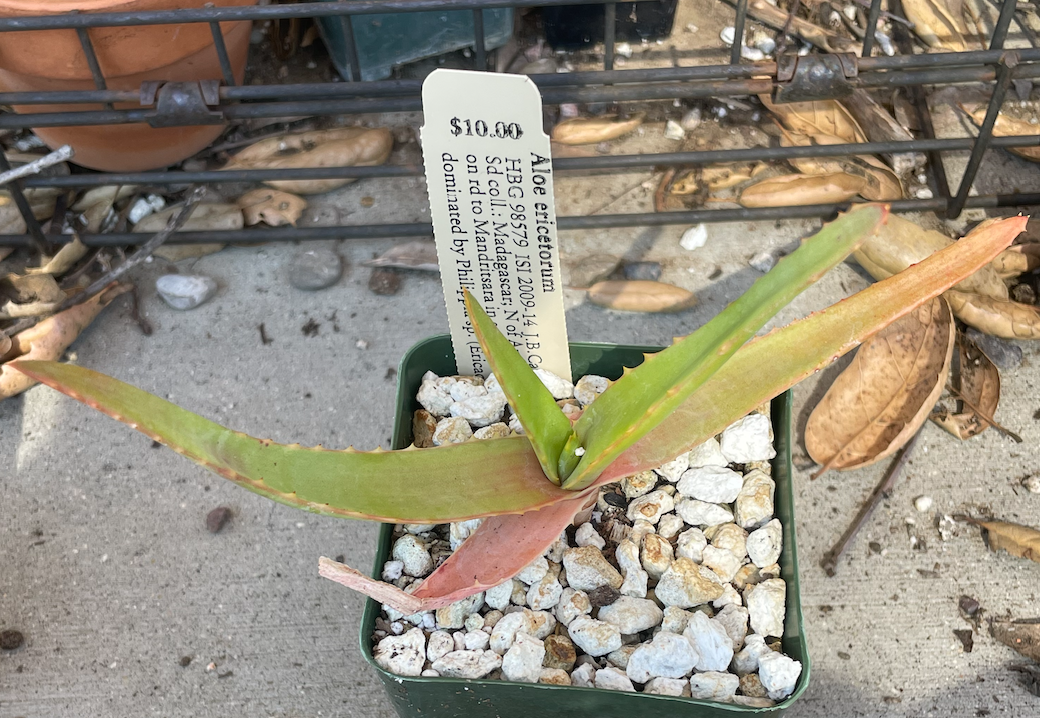

Conservation status
- CITES Appendix II

Scientific classification
- Kingdom: Plantae
- Clade: Tracheophytes
- Clade: Angiosperms
- Clade: Monocots
- Order: Asparagales
- Family: Asphodelaceae
- Subfamily: Asphodeloideae
- Genus: Aloe
- Species: A. ericetorum

Binomial name
- Aloe ericetorum Bosser

= Aloe ericetorum =

Species of plant

Aloe ericetorum is a species of aloe native to North central Madagascar first described in 1968.

== Description ==
Plants are rosette forming, with long leaves that have serrated leaf edges. Leaves in a triangle shape.

== Difference from Aloe capitata ==
The plant is able to be differentiated from Aloe capitata by shorter leaves and leaves that are more gray.

== Flowers ==
Stalks of yellow flowers on long inflorescences.
