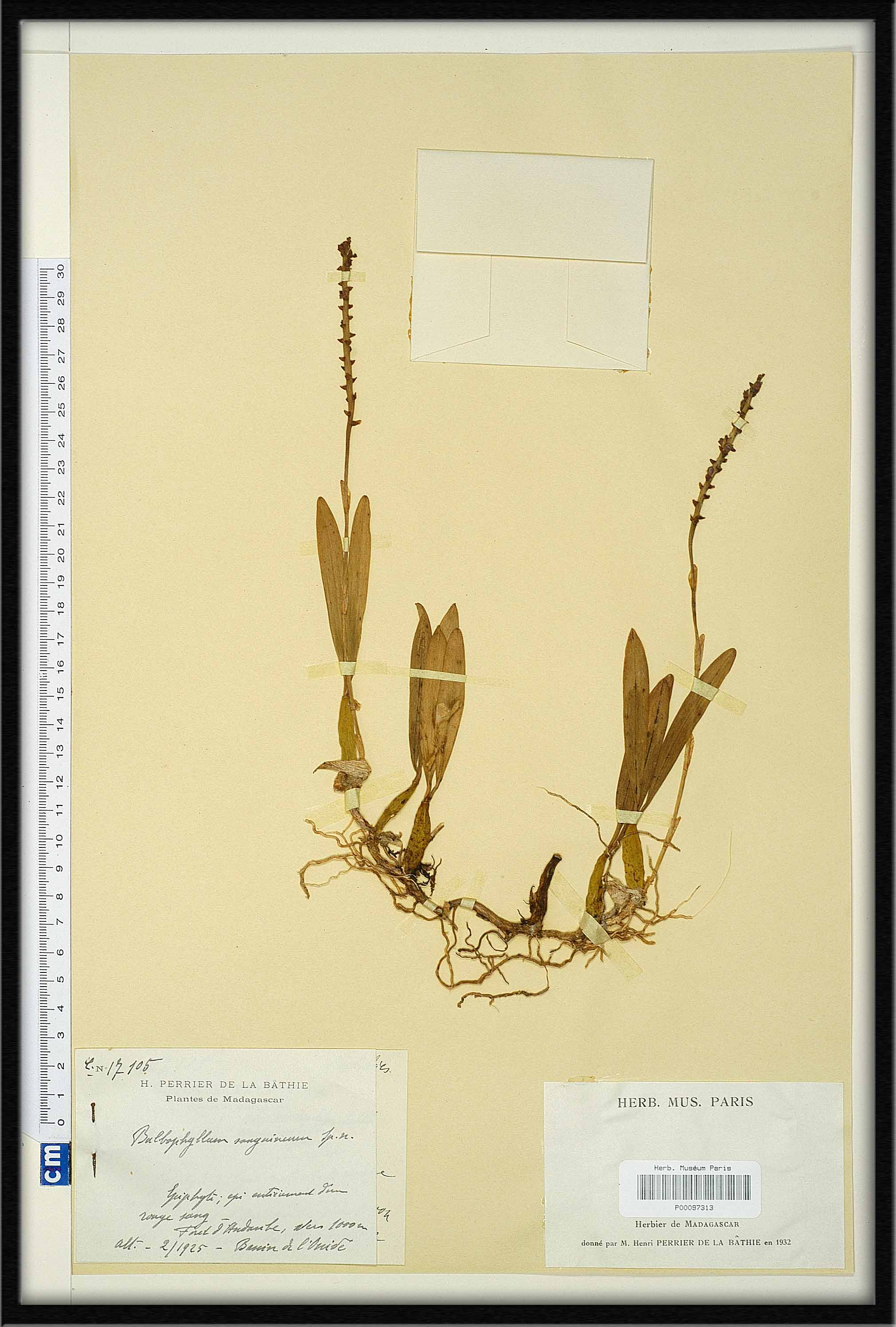

Conservation status
- Critically endangered, possibly extinct (IUCN 3.1)

Scientific classification
- Kingdom: Plantae
- Clade: Tracheophytes
- Clade: Angiosperms
- Clade: Monocots
- Order: Asparagales
- Family: Orchidaceae
- Subfamily: Epidendroideae
- Genus: Bulbophyllum
- Species: B. sanguineum

Binomial name
- Bulbophyllum sanguineum H.Perrier

= Bulbophyllum sanguineum =

Species of orchid

Bulbophyllum sanguineum is a species of orchid in the genus Bulbophyllum.
