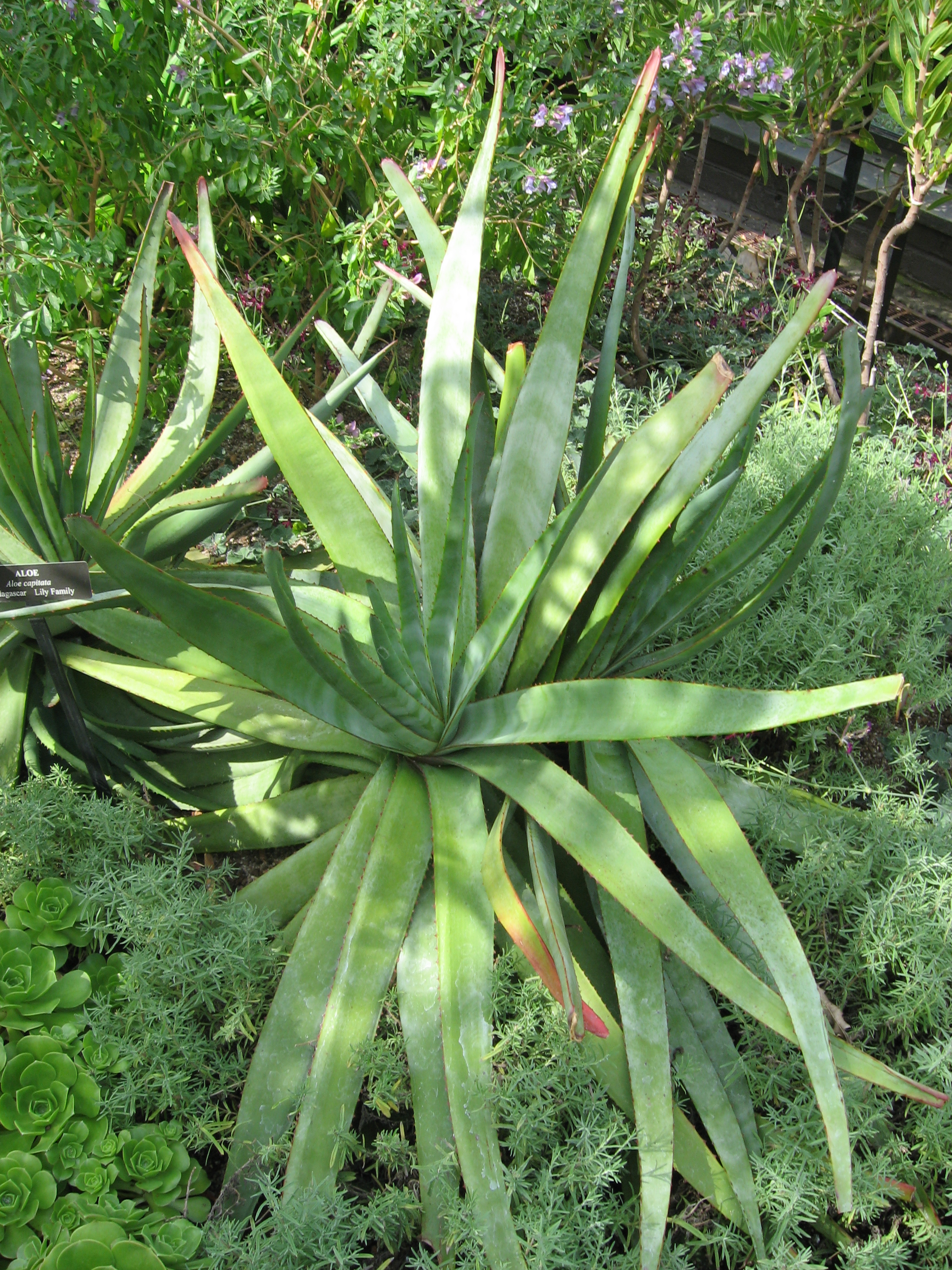

Conservation status
- Least Concern (IUCN 3.1)
- CITES Appendix II

Scientific classification
- Kingdom: Plantae
- Clade: Tracheophytes
- Clade: Angiosperms
- Clade: Monocots
- Order: Asparagales
- Family: Asphodelaceae
- Subfamily: Asphodeloideae
- Genus: Aloe
- Species: A. capitata

Binomial name
- Aloe capitata Baker

Varieties
- Aloe capitata var. angavoana J.-P.Castillon; Aloe capitata var. capitata; Aloe capitata var. quartziticola H.Perrier; Aloe capitata var. silvicola H.Perrier

= Aloe capitata =

Species of succulent

Aloe capitata is a species of flowering plant in the Asphodelaceae family. It is native to Madagascar.
