= Bulbophyllum percorniculatum =

Scientific classification
- Kingdom: Plantae
- Clade: Tracheophytes
- Clade: Angiosperms
- Clade: Monocots
- Order: Asparagales
- Family: Orchidaceae
- Subfamily: Epidendroideae
- Genus: Bulbophyllum
- Species: B. percorniculatum

Binomial name
- Bulbophyllum percorniculatum H.Perrier

Species of orchid

Bulbophyllum percorniculatum is a species of orchid. It is endemic to southeastern Madagascar.
