= Oeceoclades alismatophylla =

Scientific classification
- Kingdom: Plantae
- Clade: Tracheophytes
- Clade: Angiosperms
- Clade: Monocots
- Order: Asparagales
- Family: Orchidaceae
- Subfamily: Epidendroideae
- Genus: Oeceoclades
- Species: O. alismatophylla

Binomial name
- Oeceoclades alismatophylla (Rchb.f.) Garay & P.Taylor

Synonyms
- Eulophia alismatophylla Rchb.f.; Eulophidium alismatophyllum (Rchb.f.) Summerh.

Species of orchid

Oeceoclades alismatophylla is a species of orchid in the genus Oeceoclades that is native to Comoros and northeastern Madagascar. It was first described by the German botanist Heinrich Gustav Reichenbach in 1885 as Eulophia alismatophylla and later transferred to the genus Eulophidium in 1957 by V.S. Summerhayes. When Leslie Andrew Garay and Peter Taylor revised the genus Oeceoclades in 1976, they transferred this species to the expanded Oeceoclades as O. alismatophylla. Garay and Taylor noted that this species is broadly similar in vegetative morphology to O. analamerensis, O. lonchophylla, and O. petiolata but could be distinguished from them in floral morphology, with O. alismatophylla having lateral labellum lobes that are larger than the middle one.
