= Bulbophyllum hirsutiusculum =

Conservation status
- Endangered (IUCN 3.1)

Scientific classification
- Kingdom: Plantae
- Clade: Tracheophytes
- Clade: Angiosperms
- Clade: Monocots
- Order: Asparagales
- Family: Orchidaceae
- Subfamily: Epidendroideae
- Genus: Bulbophyllum
- Species: B. hirsutiusculum

Binomial name
- Bulbophyllum hirsutiusculum H. Perrier

Species of orchid

Bulbophyllum hirsutiusculum is a species of orchid in the genus Bulbophyllum found in Madagascar. It is critically endangered and may be extinct as a result of illegal collection for ornamental use and subsistence woodgathering.
