= Perriera =

Scientific classification
- Kingdom: Plantae
- Clade: Tracheophytes
- Clade: Angiosperms
- Clade: Eudicots
- Clade: Rosids
- Order: Sapindales
- Family: Simaroubaceae
- Genus: Perriera; Courchet

Genus of flowering plant

Perriera is a genus of flowering plants belonging to the family Simaroubaceae.

It is endemic to Madagascar.

The genus name of Perriera is in honour of Joseph Marie Henry Alfred Perrier de la Bâthie (1873–1958), a French botanist who specialized in the plants of Madagascar. It was first described and published in Bull. Soc. Bot. France Vol.52 on page 284 in 1905.

== Known species ==
According to Kew:

- Perriera madagascariensis Courchet
- Perriera orientalis Capuron
