= Bulbophyllum protectum =

Scientific classification
- Kingdom: Plantae
- Clade: Tracheophytes
- Clade: Angiosperms
- Clade: Monocots
- Order: Asparagales
- Family: Orchidaceae
- Subfamily: Epidendroideae
- Genus: Bulbophyllum
- Species: B. protectum

Binomial name
- Bulbophyllum protectum H.Perrier

Species of orchid

Bulbophyllum protectum is a species of orchid in the genus Bulbophyllum found in Madagascar.
