= Bulbophyllum papangense =

Scientific classification
- Kingdom: Plantae
- Clade: Tracheophytes
- Clade: Angiosperms
- Clade: Monocots
- Order: Asparagales
- Family: Orchidaceae
- Subfamily: Epidendroideae
- Genus: Bulbophyllum
- Species: B. papangense

Binomial name
- Bulbophyllum papangense H.Perrier 1937

Species of orchid

Bulbophyllum papangense is a species of orchid in the genus Bulbophyllum from Madagascar at elevations of 1500 meters.
