= Bulbophyllum boiteaui =

Conservation status
- Vulnerable (IUCN 3.1)

Scientific classification
- Kingdom: Plantae
- Clade: Tracheophytes
- Clade: Angiosperms
- Clade: Monocots
- Order: Asparagales
- Family: Orchidaceae
- Subfamily: Epidendroideae
- Genus: Bulbophyllum
- Species: B. boiteaui

Binomial name
- Bulbophyllum boiteaui H.Perrier

Species of orchid

Bulbophyllum boiteaui is a species of orchid in the genus Bulbophyllum found in Madagascar.
