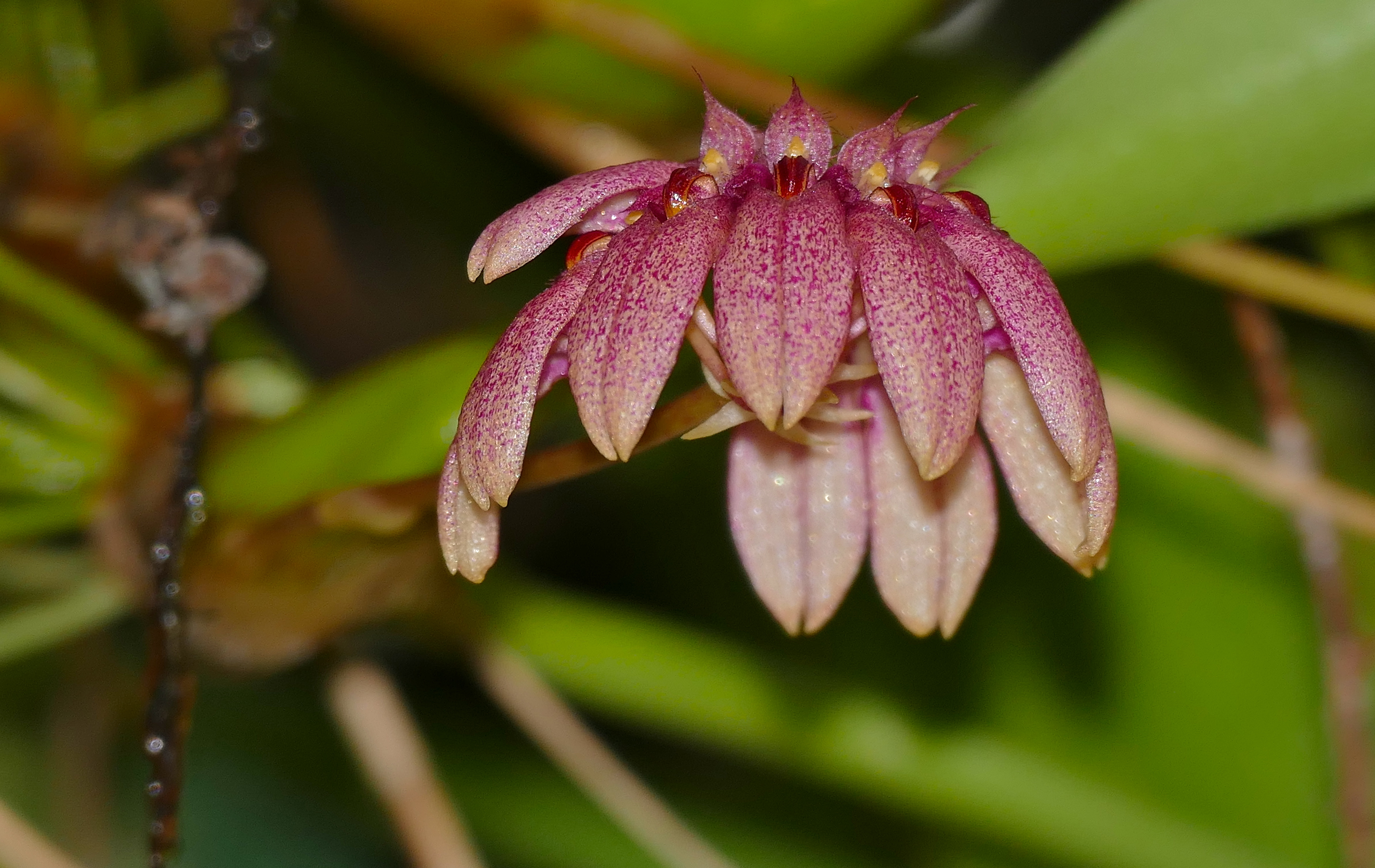

Scientific classification
- Kingdom: Plantae
- Clade: Tracheophytes
- Clade: Angiosperms
- Clade: Monocots
- Order: Asparagales
- Family: Orchidaceae
- Subfamily: Epidendroideae
- Genus: Bulbophyllum
- Species: B. trigonopus

Binomial name
- Bulbophyllum trigonopus (Rchb.f.) P.T.Ong

Synonyms
- List of synonyms: Cirrhopetalum trigonopus Rchb.f.; Bulbophyllum trigonopus Rchb.f. pro syn.; Cirrhopetalum abbreviatum Rchb.f.; Cirrhopetalum concinnum Hook.f.; Phyllorkis ridleyana (Hook.f.) Kuntze; Bulbophyllum pulchellum Ridl.; Bulbophyllum pulchellum var. brachysepalum Ridl.; Bulbophyllum pulchellum var. purpureum Ridl.; Bulbophyllum asperulum J.J.Sm.; Bulbophyllum abbreviatum (Rchb.f.) Rchb.f. ex Seidenf. nom. illeg.; Cirrhopetalum asperulum (J.J.Sm.) Garay, Hamer & Siegerist

= Bulbophyllum trigonopus =

Species of orchid

Bulbophyllum trigonopus is a species of epiphytic orchid that is found in Borneo and from Thailand to Malaysia. It was first formally described in 1881 by Heinrich Gustav Reichenbach who gave it the name Cirrhopetalum trigonopus and gave Bulbophyllum trigonopus as a synonym. The description was published in The Gardeners' Chronicle along with the first formal description of Cirrhopetalum abbreviatum. In 2017 Poh Teck Ong changed the name to Bulbophyllum trigonopus and the change has been accepted by the World Checklist of Selected Plant Families with Cirrhopetalum abbreviatum now regarded as a synonym of Bulbophyllum trigonopus.
