= Bulbophyllum comorianum =

Scientific classification
- Kingdom: Plantae
- Clade: Tracheophytes
- Clade: Angiosperms
- Clade: Monocots
- Order: Asparagales
- Family: Orchidaceae
- Subfamily: Epidendroideae
- Genus: Bulbophyllum
- Species: B. comorianum

Binomial name
- Bulbophyllum comorianum H.Perrier (1938)

Species of orchid

Bulbophyllum comorianum is a species of orchid in the genus Bulbophyllum. It is a pseudobulbous epiphyte endemic to the island of Grand Comore in the Comoros.
