= Bulbophyllum maudeae =

Scientific classification
- Kingdom: Plantae
- Clade: Tracheophytes
- Clade: Angiosperms
- Clade: Monocots
- Order: Asparagales
- Family: Orchidaceae
- Subfamily: Epidendroideae
- Genus: Bulbophyllum
- Species: B. maudeae

Binomial name
- Bulbophyllum maudeae A. D. Hawkes

Synonyms
- Bulbophyllum nigrilabium H.Perrier 1951

Species of orchid

Bulbophyllum maudeae is a species of orchid in the genus Bulbophyllum.
