= Bulbophyllum minax =

Conservation status
- Critically endangered, possibly extinct (IUCN 3.1)

Scientific classification
- Kingdom: Plantae
- Clade: Embryophytes
- Clade: Tracheophytes
- Clade: Spermatophytes
- Clade: Angiosperms
- Clade: Monocots
- Order: Asparagales
- Family: Orchidaceae
- Subfamily: Epidendroideae
- Genus: Bulbophyllum
- Species: B. minax

Binomial name
- Bulbophyllum minax Schltr.

Species of orchid

Bulbophyllum minax is a species of orchid in the genus Bulbophyllum. It is a pseudobulbous epiphyte endemic to Madagascar. It is native to Fianarantsoa Province, where it grows in subhumid forests from 1,500 to 1,999 metres elevation. It is critically endangered due to deforestation.
