= Bulbophyllum lakatoense =

Scientific classification
- Kingdom: Plantae
- Clade: Tracheophytes
- Clade: Angiosperms
- Clade: Monocots
- Order: Asparagales
- Family: Orchidaceae
- Subfamily: Epidendroideae
- Genus: Bulbophyllum
- Species: B. lakatoense

Binomial name
- Bulbophyllum lakatoense Bosser

Species of orchid

Bulbophyllum lakatoense is a species of orchid in the genus Bulbophyllum. The species is native to Madagascar.
