= Erica comorensis =

Scientific classification
- Kingdom: Plantae
- Clade: Tracheophytes
- Clade: Angiosperms
- Clade: Eudicots
- Clade: Asterids
- Order: Ericales
- Family: Ericaceae
- Genus: Erica
- Species: E. comorensis

Binomial name
- Erica comorensis (Engl.) Dorr & E.G.H.Oliv. (1999)

Synonyms
- Philippia comorensis Engl. (1909)

Species of flowering plant

Erica comorensis is a species of flowering plant (angiosperms) in the heather family (Ericaceae). It is endemic to the Comoro Islands in the Indian Ocean. It grows from .5 to 2 meters high.

Erica comorensis is found at high elevations on Grand Comore, where it is the predominant species in the dry ericaceous scrubland from 1800 to 2200 meters elevation.

There is one recognized subspecies, Erica comorensis subsp. anjurensis (Alm & T.C.E.Fr.) Dorr & E.G.H.Oliv.., which is found on the island of Anjouan.
