= Lucien Désiré Joseph Courchet =

French botanist (1851–1924)

- Born: 31 July 1851; La Garde-Freinet
- Died: 10 March 1924 (aged 72)
- Occupation: French botanist

Lucien Désiré Joseph Courchet (31 July 1851– 10 March 1924) was a French botanist known for his work in the fields of plant anatomy and physiology.

In 1884 he received his agrégation, afterwards being appointed professor of botany at the École supérieure de pharmacie in Montpellier (1889). As a taxonomist he was author of the plant genus Perriera (family Simaroubaceae).

== Selected works ==
- Étude sur le groupe des aphides et en particulier sur les pucerons du térébinthe & du lentisque, 1878 – Study of aphid groups, in particular on aphids affecting oaks and mastics.
- Étude sur les galles causées par des aphidiens, 1879 – Study on galls caused by aphids.
- Les Ombellifères en général et les espèces usitées en pharmacie en particulier, - An account of the Umbelliferae (Apiaceae) with particular reference to those species having medicinal properties.
- Du noyau dans les cellules végétales et animales : structure et fonctions, 1884 – The nucleus of plant and animal cells; structure and function.
- Recherches sur les chromoleucites, 1888 – Research of chromoleucites.
- Traité de botanique, comprenant l'anatomie et la physiologie végétales et les familles naturelles, (two volumes 1897–98) – Treatise of botany, including the anatomy and physiology of natural botanical families.

Courchet made contributions towards the multi-volume series "Flore Générale de L'Indo-Chine" (primary editors Paul Henri Lecomte and François Gagnepain).
