= Bulbophyllum ceriodorum =

Conservation status
- Critically Endangered (IUCN 3.1)

Scientific classification
- Kingdom: Plantae
- Clade: Embryophytes
- Clade: Tracheophytes
- Clade: Spermatophytes
- Clade: Angiosperms
- Clade: Monocots
- Order: Asparagales
- Family: Orchidaceae
- Subfamily: Epidendroideae
- Genus: Bulbophyllum
- Species: B. ceriodorum

Binomial name
- Bulbophyllum ceriodorum Boiteau

Species of orchid

Bulbophyllum ceriodorum is a species of flowering plant in the family Orchidaceae. It is a pseudobulbous epiphyte endemic to southeastern Madagascar. It is critically endangered due to wildfires and subsistence woodgathering.
