= Bulbophyllum rhodostachys =

Scientific classification
- Kingdom: Plantae
- Clade: Tracheophytes
- Clade: Angiosperms
- Clade: Monocots
- Order: Asparagales
- Family: Orchidaceae
- Subfamily: Epidendroideae
- Genus: Bulbophyllum
- Species: B. rhodostachys

Binomial name
- Bulbophyllum rhodostachys Schltr. 1916

Species of orchid

Bulbophyllum rhodostachys is a species of orchid in the genus Bulbophyllum found in Madagascar at elevations of 300 meters.
