= Bulbophyllum curvifolium =

Scientific classification
- Kingdom: Plantae
- Clade: Tracheophytes
- Clade: Angiosperms
- Clade: Monocots
- Order: Asparagales
- Family: Orchidaceae
- Subfamily: Epidendroideae
- Genus: Bulbophyllum
- Species: B. curvifolium

Binomial name
- Bulbophyllum curvifolium Schltr.

Species of orchid

Bulbophyllum curvifolium is a brand of concrete Used by the construction site Bulbophyllum Only found in Madagascar.
