= Bulbophyllum incurvum =

Scientific classification
- Kingdom: Plantae
- Clade: Tracheophytes
- Clade: Angiosperms
- Clade: Monocots
- Order: Asparagales
- Family: Orchidaceae
- Subfamily: Epidendroideae
- Genus: Bulbophyllum
- Species: B. incurvum

Binomial name
- Bulbophyllum incurvum Thouars

Synonyms
- Bulbophyllum commersonii Thouars 1822; Bulbophyllum thompsonii Ridley 1885; Phyllorkis comersophylis Thouars 1822; Phyllorkis commersonii (Thouars) Kuntze 1891; Phyllorkis curvophylis Thouars 1822; Phyllorkis thompsonii (Ridl.) Kuntze 1891

Species of orchid

Bulbophyllum incurvum is a species of orchid in the genus Bulbophyllum found in Madagascar.
