= Bulbophyllum rubrolabium =

Scientific classification
- Kingdom: Plantae
- Clade: Tracheophytes
- Clade: Angiosperms
- Clade: Monocots
- Order: Asparagales
- Family: Orchidaceae
- Subfamily: Epidendroideae
- Genus: Bulbophyllum
- Species: B. rubrolabium

Binomial name
- Bulbophyllum rubrolabium Schltr. 1916

Species of orchid

Bulbophyllum rubrolabium is a species of orchid in the genus Bulbophyllum found in Madagascar at elevations of 1500 meters.
