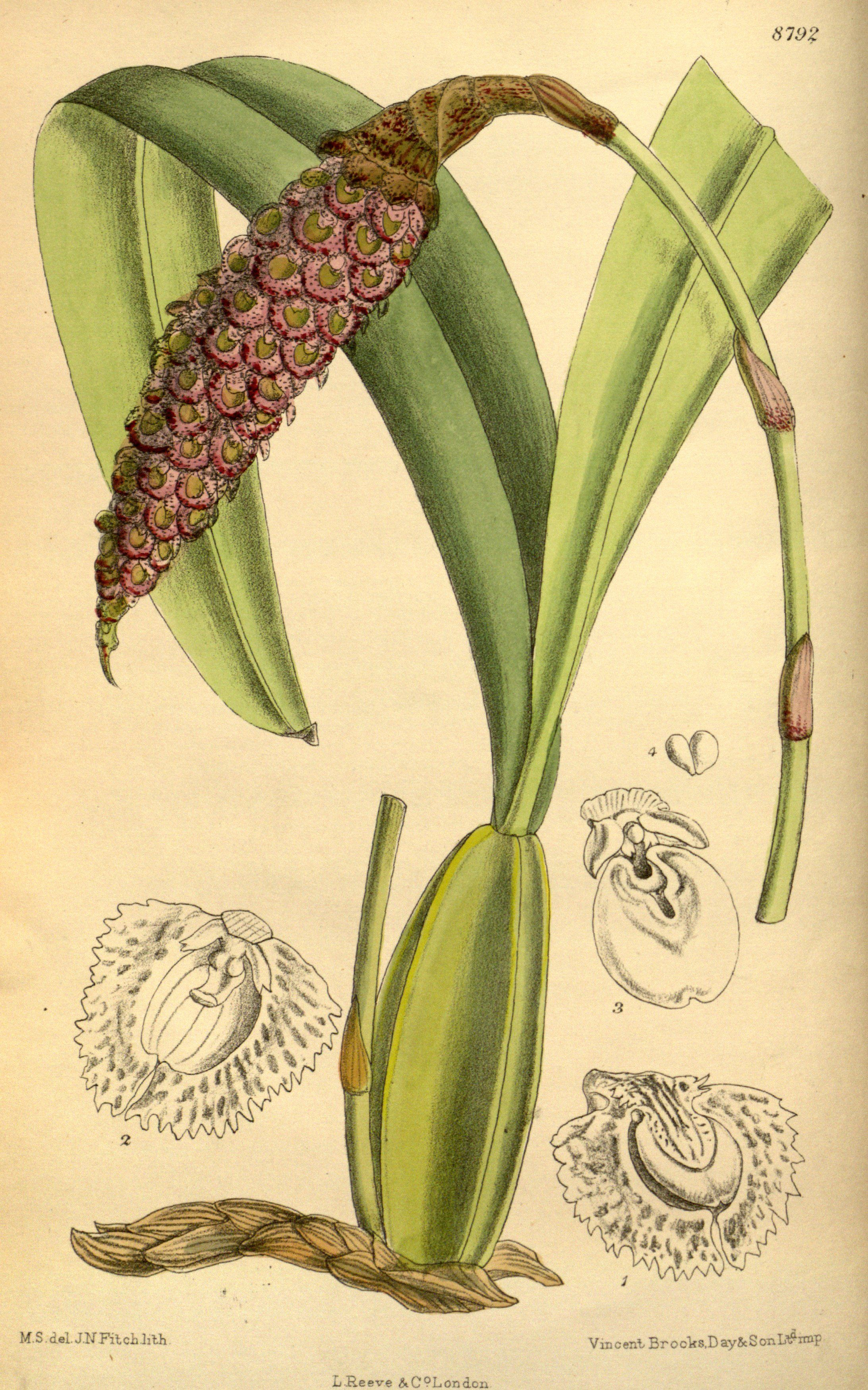

Scientific classification
- Kingdom: Plantae
- Clade: Tracheophytes
- Clade: Angiosperms
- Clade: Monocots
- Order: Asparagales
- Family: Orchidaceae
- Subfamily: Epidendroideae
- Genus: Bulbophyllum
- Species: B. coriophorum

Binomial name
- Bulbophyllum coriophorum Ridl.

Synonyms
- Bulbophyllum compactum Kraenzl. (1893); Bulbophyllum crenulatum Rolfe (1905); Bulbophyllum robustum Rolfe (1905); Bulbophyllum mandrakanum Schltr. (1924)

= Bulbophyllum coriophorum =

Species of orchid

Bulbophyllum coriophorum is a species of orchid in the genus Bulbophyllum found in Madagascar.

Media related to Bulbophyllum coriophorum at Wikimedia Commons
