= Bulbophyllum ophiuchus =

Scientific classification
- Kingdom: Plantae
- Clade: Tracheophytes
- Clade: Angiosperms
- Clade: Monocots
- Order: Asparagales
- Family: Orchidaceae
- Subfamily: Epidendroideae
- Genus: Bulbophyllum
- Species: B. ophiuchus

Binomial name
- Bulbophyllum ophiuchus Ridl.

Synonyms
- Bulbophyllum mangoroanum Schltr. 1916

Species of orchid

Bulbophyllum ophiuchus is a species of orchid in the genus Bulbophyllum found in Madagascar.
