= Bulbophyllum leonii =

Scientific classification
- Kingdom: Plantae
- Clade: Tracheophytes
- Clade: Angiosperms
- Clade: Monocots
- Order: Asparagales
- Family: Orchidaceae
- Subfamily: Epidendroideae
- Genus: Bulbophyllum
- Species: B. leonii

Binomial name
- Bulbophyllum leonii Kraenzl. (1900)

Synonyms
- Bulbophyllum humblotianum Kraenzl. (1902)

Species of orchid

Bulbophyllum leonii is a species of orchid in the genus Bulbophyllum. It is a pseudobulbous epiphyte endemic to the Comoro Islands.
