= Joseph Marie Henry Alfred Perrier de la Bâthie =

French botanist (1873–1958)

- Born: August 11, 1873
- Died: October 2, 1958 (aged 85)
- Citizenship: French
- Known for: Flora of Madagascar
- Scientific career
- Fields: Botany
- Author abbrev. (botany): H.Perrier

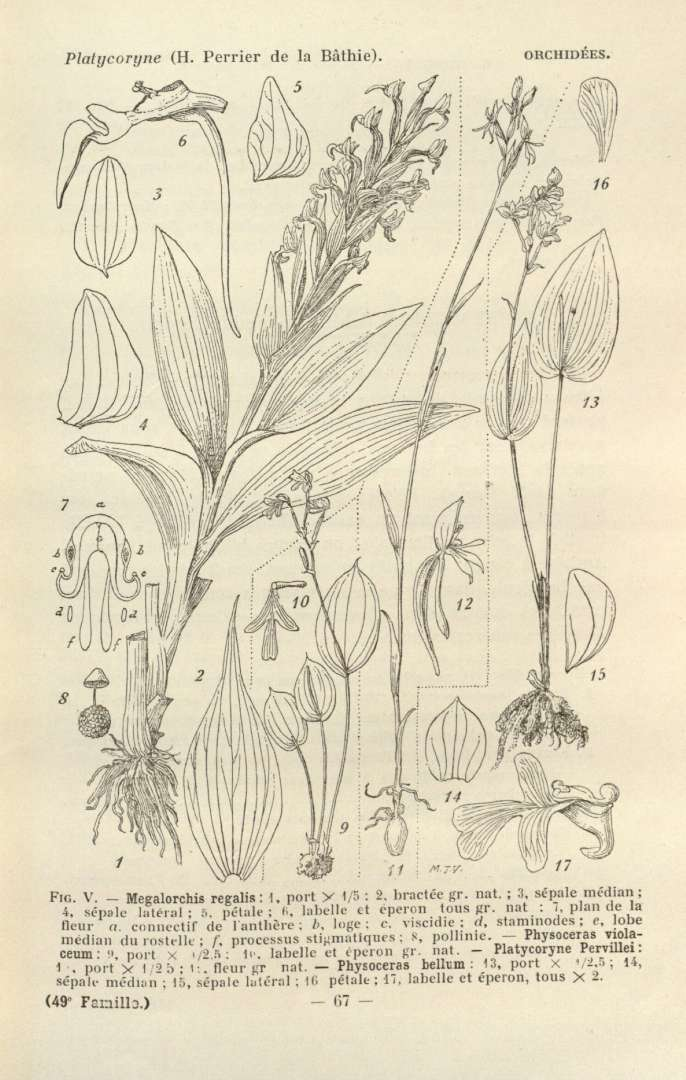
Illustration from Flore de Madagascar et des Comores

Joseph Marie Henry Alfred Perrier de la Bâthie (French pronunciation: [ʒozɛf maʁi ɑ̃ʁi alfʁɛd pɛʁje də la bati]; 11 August 1873 – 2 October 1958) was a French botanist who specialized in the plants of Madagascar.

He is the nephew of Eugène Pierre Perrier de la Bâthie, (1825-1916), another botanist, who also collected plants with him.

He delineated the two chief floristic provinces of Madagascar (see Ecoregions of Madagascar). Some of his works include La végétation malgache (1921), Biogéographie de plantes de Madagascar (1936), and numerous volumes of the series Flore de Madagascar et des Comores (1946-1952).

== Honours ==
The orchid genus Neobathiea (originally Bathiea) was named in his honor, as was the indriid lemur Perrier's sifaka (Propithecus perrieri). He has other plant genera named in his honour. Such as in 1905, botanist Lucien Désiré Joseph Courchet published Perriera, a genus of flowering plants from Madagascar, belonging to the family Simaroubaceae. Then in 1915, botanist Hochr. published Perrierophytum, a genus of flowering plants from Mozambique and Madagascar, belonging to the family Malvaceae. In 1924, A.Camus published Perrierbambus, a bamboo in the grass family. In 1951, Alberto Judice Leote Cavaco published Perrierodendron is a genus of trees and shrubs in the family Sarcolaenaceae. Then finally in 1978, (A.Berger) H.Ohba published Perrierosedum, succulent plants of the family Crassulaceae.

Several species of Madagascar plants were also named for him, including Adenia perrieri, Adansonia perrieri (or Perrier's baobab), Erythrina perrieri, Ensete perrieri, Euphorbia perrieri, Gereaua perrieri, Jumelleanthus perrieri Hochr., Melanophylla perrieri, Podocarpus perrieri, Takhtajania perrieri, (originally named Bubbia perrieri) and Xerosicyos perrieri.
