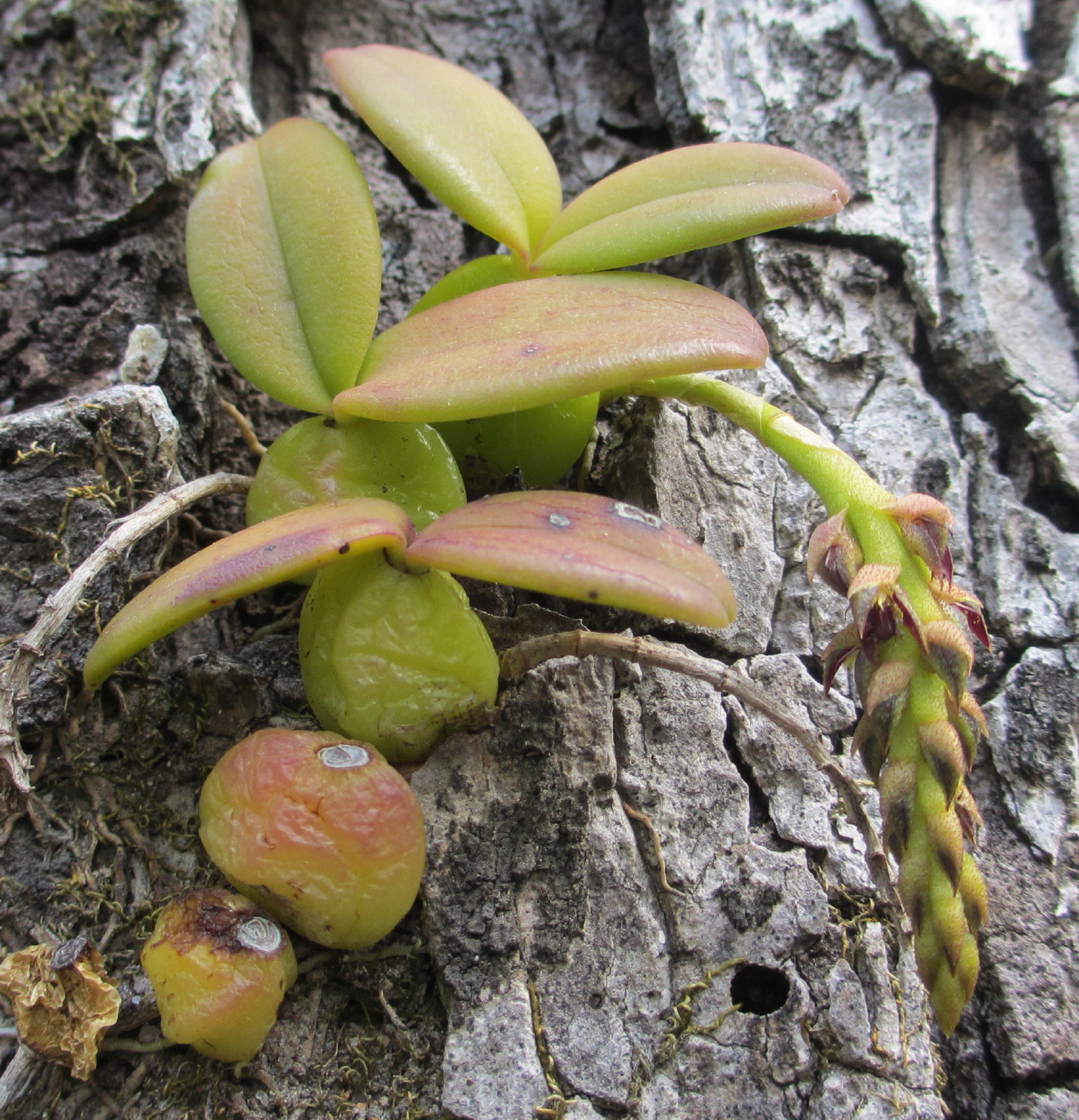
- Bulbophyllum elliotii

Scientific classification
- Kingdom: Plantae
- Clade: Tracheophytes
- Clade: Angiosperms
- Clade: Monocots
- Order: Asparagales
- Family: Orchidaceae
- Subfamily: Epidendroideae
- Genus: Bulbophyllum
- Section: Bulbophyllum sect. Lupulina; G.A. Fischer ex J.J. Verm. 2014

Type species
- Bulbophyllum occultum

Species
- See text

Synonyms
- Bulbophyllum sect. Calamaria Perrier 1939; Bulbophyllum sect. Humblotiorchis Schlechter 1924

= Bulbophyllum sect. Lupulina =

Section of flowering plants

Bulbophyllum sect. Lupulina is a section of the genus Bulbophyllum.

== Description ==
Species in this section is are rhizomatus with one to two leaves on the pseudobulb blooming with a racemose of flowers with bracts.

== Distribution ==
Plants from this section are found in Tropical Africa and Madagascar.

== Species ==
Bulbophyllum section Lupulina comprises the following species:

| Image | Name | Distribution | Elevation (m) |
|---|---|---|---|
| | Bulbophyllum bicoloratum Schltr. 1924 | Madagascar | 300–1,000 metres (980–3,280 ft) |
| | Bulbophyllum cirrhoglossum H.Perrier 1951 | Madagascar | 900–1,200 metres (3,000–3,900 ft) |
| | Bulbophyllum cryptostachyum Schltr. 1924 | Madagascar | 1,000 metres (3,300 ft) |
| | Bulbophyllum elliotii Rolfe 1891 | Burundia, Zaire, Tanzania, Malawi, Zambia, Zimbabwe, South Africa (Transvaal) and Madagascar | 100–1,900 metres (330–6,230 ft) |
| | Bulbophyllum erectum Thouars 1822 | Madagascar | 0–400 metres (0–1,312 ft) |
| | Bulbophyllum hildebrandtii Rchb.f. 1881 | Madagascar | 0–600 metres (0–1,969 ft) |
| | Bulbophyllum humblotii Rolfe 1891 | Malawi, Tanzania, Zimbabwe, Madagascar and the Seychelles | 650–1,200 metres (2,130–3,940 ft) |
| | Bulbophyllum lecouflei Bosser 1989 | Madagascar | 0–100 metres (0–328 ft) |
| | Bulbophyllum luteobracteatum Jum. & H.Perrier 1912 | Madagascar | 1,500 metres (4,900 ft) |
| | Bulbophyllum obtusatum Schltr. 1924 | Madagascar | 0–1,400 metres (0–4,593 ft) |
| | Bulbophyllum occultum Thouars 1822 | Madagascar | 0–1,500 metres (0–4,921 ft) |
| | Bulbophyllum pentastichum (Pfitzer ex Kraenzl.) Schltr. 1915 | Madagascar | 0–100 metres (0–328 ft) |
| | Bulbophyllum ptiloglossum H.Wendl. & Kraenzl. 1897 | Madagascar | |
| | Bulbophyllum porphyrostachys Summerh. 1951 | Nigeria, Cameroon, Congo and Equatorial Guinea | |
| | Bulbophyllum pusillum Thouars 1822 | Madagascar | |
| | Bulbophyllum quadrifarium Rolfe 1903 | Madagascar | 0–500 metres (0–1,640 ft) |
| | Bulbophyllum rubrum Jum. & H.Perrier 1912 | Madagascar | 0–300 metres (0–984 ft) |
| | Bulbophyllum ruginosum H.Perrier 1937 | Madagascar | 1,000 metres (3,300 ft) |
| | Bulbophyllum senghasii G.A.Fischer & Sieder 2009 | Madagascar | |
| | Bulbophyllum tetragonum Lindl. 1830 | Sierra Leone, Ghana, Ivory Coast, Liberia, Cameroon and Zaire | 900 metres (3,000 ft) |
| | Bulbophyllum trifarium Rolfe 1910 | Madagascar | 0–300 metres (0–984 ft) |
| | Bulbophyllum viguieri Schltr. 1922 | Madagascar | |
