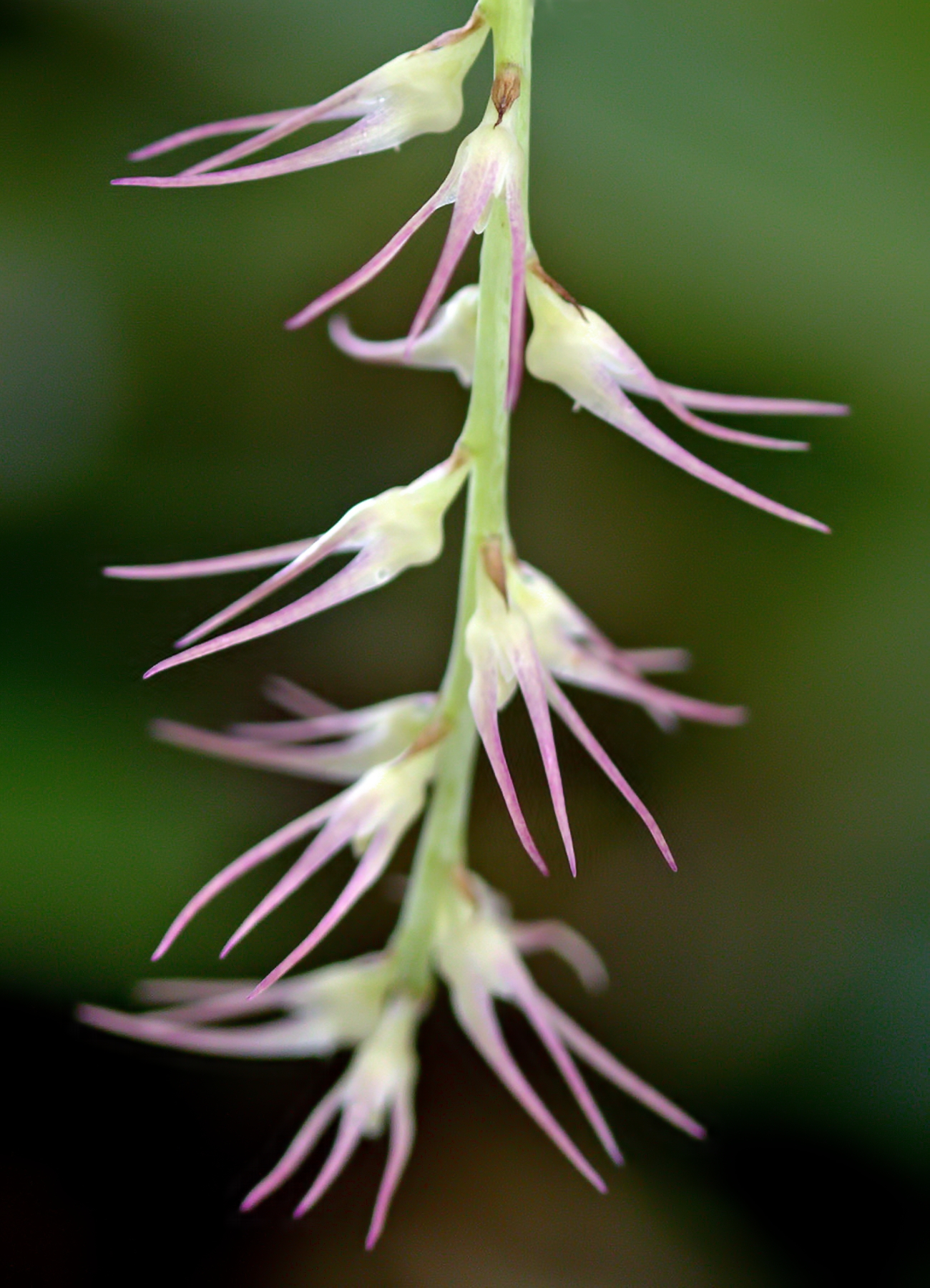
- Bulbophyllum nutans

Scientific classification
- Kingdom: Plantae
- Clade: Tracheophytes
- Clade: Angiosperms
- Clade: Monocots
- Order: Asparagales
- Family: Orchidaceae
- Subfamily: Epidendroideae
- Genus: Bulbophyllum
- Section: Bulbophyllum sect. Bulbophyllum; G.A.Fischer & J.J.Verm.

Type species
- Bulbophyllum nutans

Species
- See text

Synonyms
- Bulbophyllum sect. Lemuraea Schltr. 1925

= Bulbophyllum sect. Bulbophyllum =

Section of flowering plants

Bulbophyllum sect. Bulbophyllum is a section of the genus Bulbophyllum.

== Description ==
Species in this section have pseudo-bulbs with 1-2 leaves that are densely clustered.

== Distribution ==
Plants from this section are found in Madagascar.

== Species ==
Bulbophyllum section Bulbophyllum comprises the following species:

Image	Name	Distribution	Elevation (m)
	Bulbophyllum brachystachyum Schltr. 1924	Madagascar	700–1,600 metres (2,300–5,200 ft)
	Bulbophyllum densum Thouars 1822	Madagascar, the Mascarenes and Reunion	400–1,200 metres (1,300–3,900 ft)
	Bulbophyllum liparidioides Schltr. 1924	Madagascar	800–1,200 metres (2,600–3,900 ft)
	Bulbophyllum nutans (Thouars) Thouars 1822	Madagascar and Zanzibar	1,000–2,200 metres (3,300–7,200 ft)
	Bulbophyllum pendulum Thouars 1822	Mauritius, Réunion	
	Bulbophyllum rutenbergianum Schltr. 1924	Madagascar	1,300–2,500 metres (4,300–8,200 ft)
	Bulbophyllum trilineatum H.Perrier 1937	Madagascar	1,500 metres (4,900 ft)
