= B. erectum =

B. erectum may refer to:

- Brachyelytrum erectum, a grass species in the genus Brachyelytrum
- Bulbophyllum erectum, an orchid species

== See also ==
- Erectum (disambiguation)
