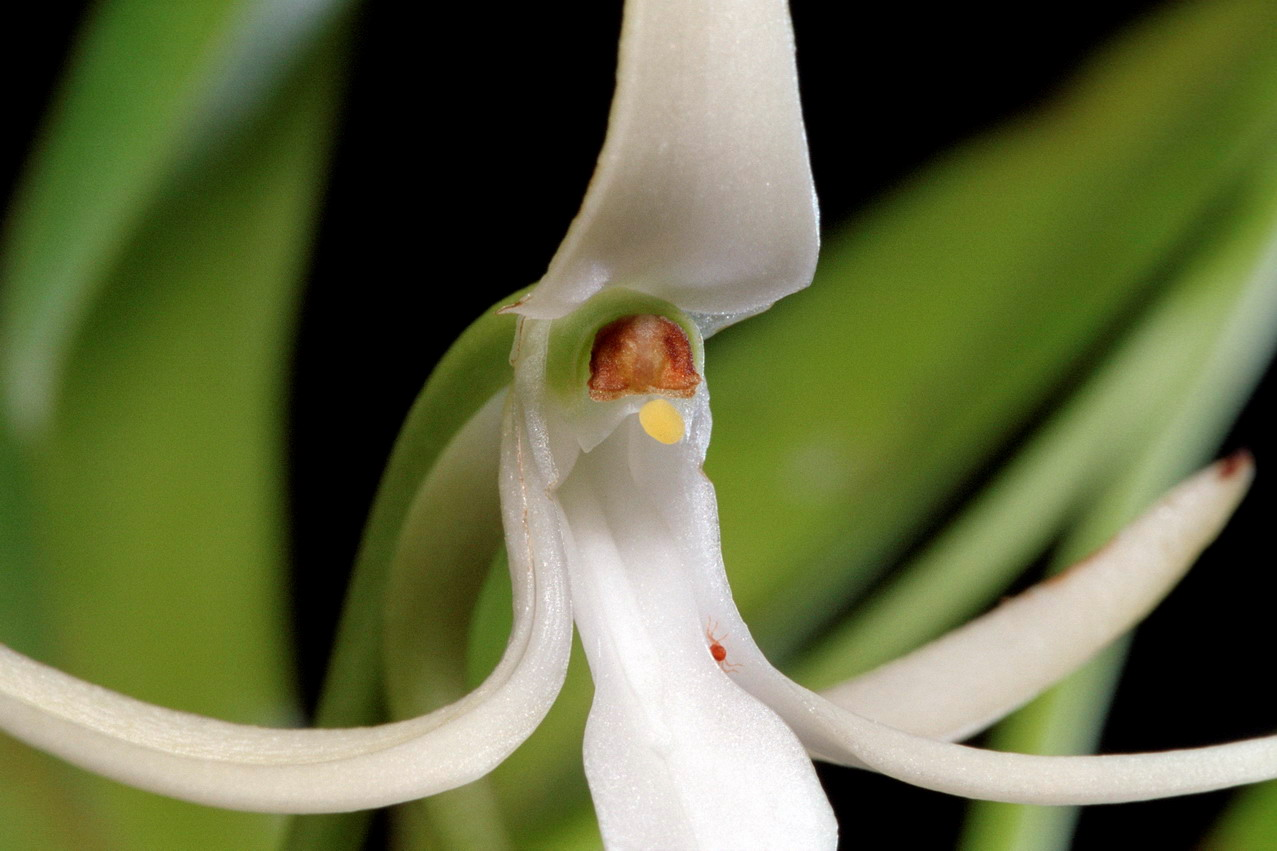

Scientific classification
- Kingdom: Plantae
- Clade: Tracheophytes
- Clade: Angiosperms
- Clade: Monocots
- Order: Asparagales
- Family: Orchidaceae
- Subfamily: Epidendroideae
- Genus: Jumellea
- Species: J. recta

Binomial name
- Jumellea recta (Thouars) Schltr.

Synonyms
- Angraecum rectum Thouars (basionym); Angraecum recurvum Thouars; Aerobion recurvum (Thouars) Spreng.; Aerobion rectum (Thouars) Spreng.; Aeranthes recta (Thouars) S. Moore; Aeranthes recta var. recurva (Thouars) S. Moore; Angorchis recurva (Thouars) Kuntze; Epidorchis recta (Thouars) Kuntze; Macroplectrum rectum (Thouars) Finet; Jumellea recurva (Thouars) Schltr.

= Jumellea recta =

Species of orchid

Jumellea recta is a species of orchid endemic to Réunion and Mauritius.
