= Abel Aubert du Petit-Thouars =

French Navy officer

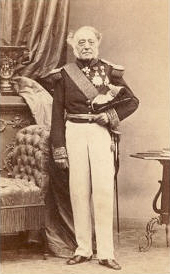
- Photograph du Petit-Thouars
- Born: 3 August 1793; La Fessardière, near Saumur, France
- Died: 16 March 1864 (aged 70); Paris, France
- Military career
- Allegiance: France
- Branch: French Navy
- Service years: 1804–1858
- Rank: Vice admiral

Vice-Admiral Abel Aubert du Petit-Thouars (3 August 1793 – 16 March 1864) was a French Navy officer who played a prominent role in the establishment of French Polynesia.

== Early life ==
He was born at the castle of La Fessardière, near Saumur. His uncle Aristide Aubert du Petit-Thouars was one of the heroes of the Battle of the Nile. He joined the French Navy in 1804, where he was a cabin boy in the Boulogne fleet.

== Naval career ==
He was the captain of the Inconstant from 1823 to 1825. He sailed her to Brazil, and remained her captain on station in Brazil. He was promoted to Commander (Capitaine de frégate) in 1824.

Du Petit-Thouars frequently travelled to Algeria, and had a decisive role in the conquest of Algiers, where he developed the attack plans. During the battle, he commanded the 20-gun Griffon.

He was later put in charge of the Southern Seas command, in the Pacific Ocean. In 1834 he played a key role in protecting French shipping interests against the Peruvians.

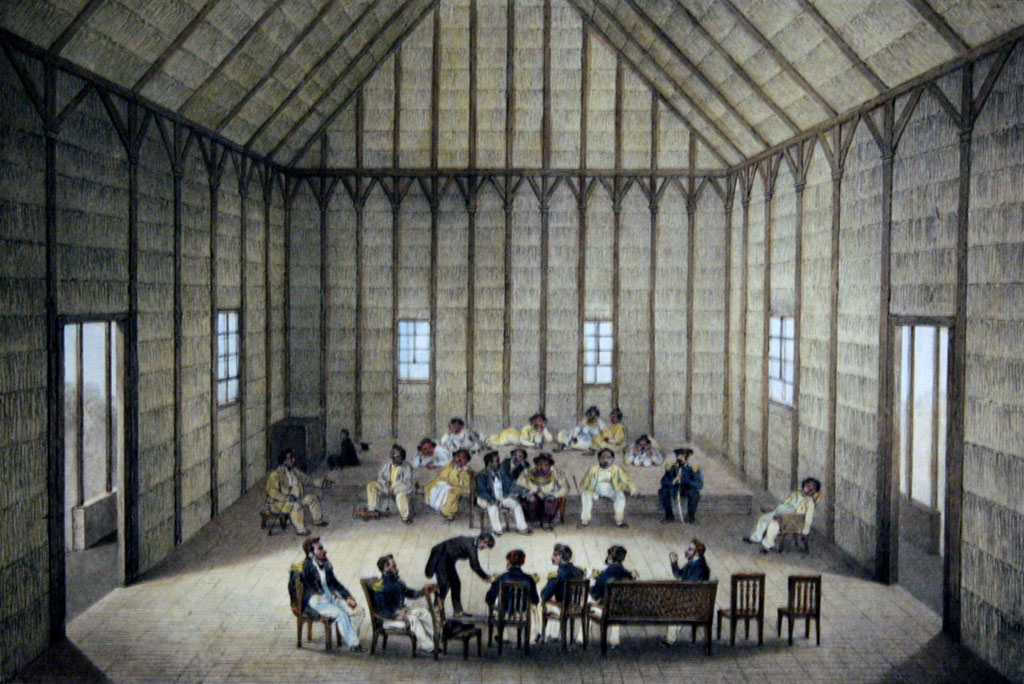
Meeting with Hawaiians in July 1837

He became "Capitaine de vaisseau" on 6 January 1834, and accomplished a circumnavigation between 1836 and 1839 on the frigate Vénus. Also on board were the hydrographer Urbain Dortet of Tessan, the doctor-naturalist Adolphe Simon Neboux, and the surgeon Charles René Augustin Léclancher. During this voyage the Marquesas were explored. He published an account in 1840 with the title Voyage around the world on the frigate Venus during the years 1836-1839 (French: Voyage autour du monde sur la frégate "la Vénus" pendant les années 1836-1839); the book contained maps of the ports visited.

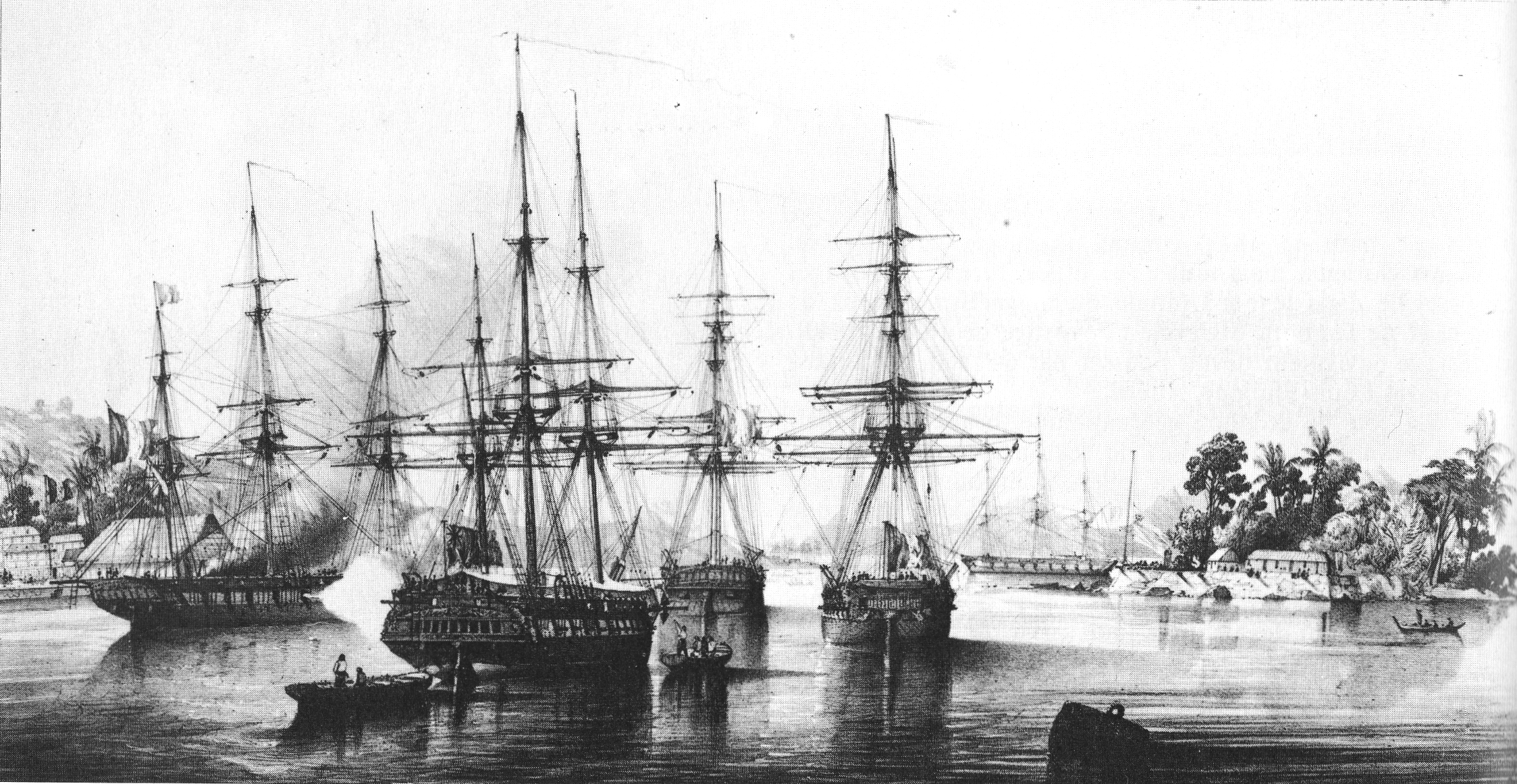
Abel Aubert du Petit-Thouars taking over Tahiti on 9 September 1842

He was made Rear-Admiral (French: Contre-amiral) on 12 July 1841, in charge of the Pacific Naval Division. His mission was to take possession of the Marquesas Islands. In Tahiti, he confronted Queen Pōmare IV, and the English missionary and Consul George Pritchard (1796–1883). He managed to expel Pritchard and established the French protectorate over Tahiti, and the Marquesas Islands. He was initially denounced for his actions by the French government, which feared a conflict with Great Britain. Relations between France and Great Britain soured considerably during the reign of Louis-Philippe, due to this so-called "Pritchard Affair".

Du Petit-Thouars became a Vice-Admiral (French: Vice-amiral) in 1846.

== Retirement and death ==
Du Petit-Thouars retired from the navy in 1858.

He died in Paris in 1864.

== Children ==
He had no children, but adopted the son of his sister, known as Abel-Nicolas Bergasse du Petit-Thouars, who also became an Admiral, and played an important role during the Boshin War in Japan.

== Botany ==
Admiral du Petit-Thouars was a significant enough botanist to have his name given an official abbreviation. The standard author abbreviation A.Thouars is used to indicate this person as the author when citing a botanical name.

== Family ==
His grand-uncles:

- Louis-Marie Aubert du Petit-Thouars (1758–1831), French botanist.
- Aristide Aubert du Petit-Thouars (1760–1798), French Navy officer, hero of the Battle of the Nile.

His nephew and adopted son:

- Abel-Nicolas Bergasse du Petit-Thouars (1832–1890), French Navy admiral who participated to the Boshin War in Japan.

== Animals named in his honor ==
- Goniofusus dupetitthouarsi
