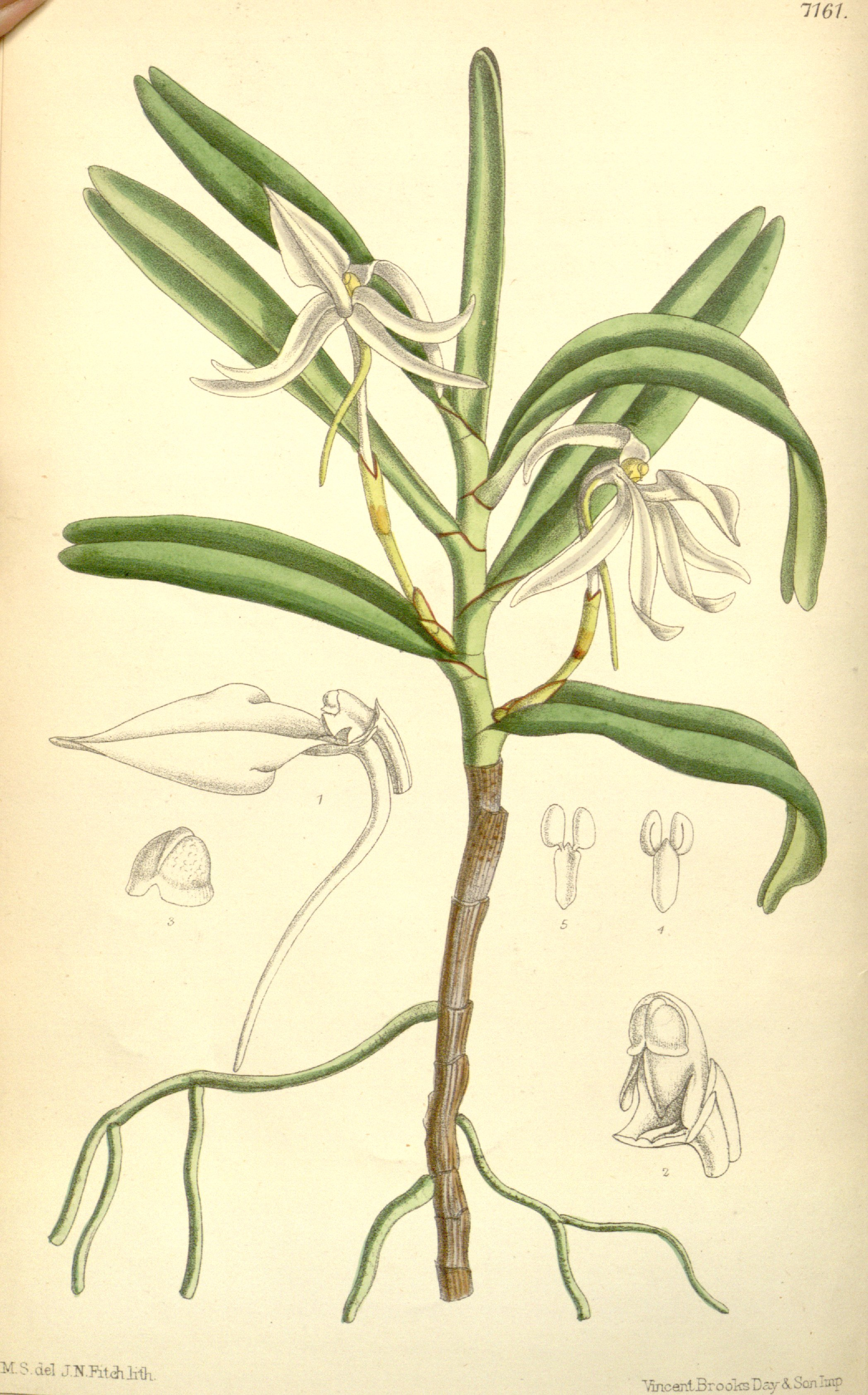
- 1891 illustration (as Angraecum fragrans) from Curtis's botanical magazine Volume 117

Scientific classification
- Kingdom: Plantae
- Clade: Tracheophytes
- Clade: Angiosperms
- Clade: Monocots
- Order: Asparagales
- Family: Orchidaceae
- Subfamily: Epidendroideae
- Genus: Jumellea
- Species: J. fragrans

Binomial name
- Jumellea fragrans (Thouars) Schltr.
- Jumellea fragrans is native to Mauritius and Réunion

Synonyms
- Aeranthes fragrans (Thouars) Rchb.f.; Aerobion fragrans (Thouars) Spreng.; Angorkis fragrangis Thouars; Angraecum fragrans Thouars; Epidorkis fragrans (Thouars) Kuntze

= Jumellea fragrans =

Species of orchid

Jumellea fragrans, also known as faham, is a species in the family Orchidaceae native to the islands of Mauritius and Réunion.

== Description ==
The species blooms in March–April with a single flowered inflorescence with 3 basal bracts. The flower has a spur of approximately 39 mm long and is pollinated by hawk moths.

=== Phytochemistry ===
Coumarin, and two groups of diterpenes (kaurenes, phytadienes) have been isolated from this species foliage.

== Taxonomy ==
It was first described as Angraecum fragrans Thouars by Louis-Marie Aubert du Petit-Thouars in 1809. It was moved to the genus Jumellea Schltr. as Jumellea fragrans (Thouars) Schltr. by Rudolf Schlechter in 1914. It is sometimes confused with Jumellea rossii, which occurs at higher altitudes, whereas Jumellea fragrans occurs at lower elevations. The two species can be differentiated by the length of the spur, the leaf length, as well as the leaf width.

=== Phylogeny ===
Jumellea fragrans is the sister group to Jumellea rossii. It is also closely related to Jumellea tenuibracteata, Jumellea francoisii, and Jumellea alionae:

- - - - - Jumellea fragrans
        - Jumellea rossii
      - - Jumellea spec.
        - Jumellea tenuibracteata
    - Jumellea francoisii
  - Jumellea alionae

== Distribution and habitat ==
It is endemic to Mauritius, Reunion, where it grows as an epiphyte in the lowland rain forest at elevations of up to 500 m above sea level.

== Conservation ==
It is threatened due to unsustainable overcollection in wild habitats and lack of agricultural production. It is recommended to categorize Jumellea fragrans as vulnerable (VU) under the IUCN Red List criteria.

== Uses ==
The fragrant leaves and flowers are boiled in hot water to extract its aromatic qualities. This is used to flavour rum on Reunion Island. Other uses that have fallen out of favour include digestive aid, remedy for respiratory disease, ice cream and custards. The plant's use for medicinal purposes on Mauritius is thought to be critically endangered.
