= Abel-Nicolas Bergasse du Petit-Thouars =

French Navy officer

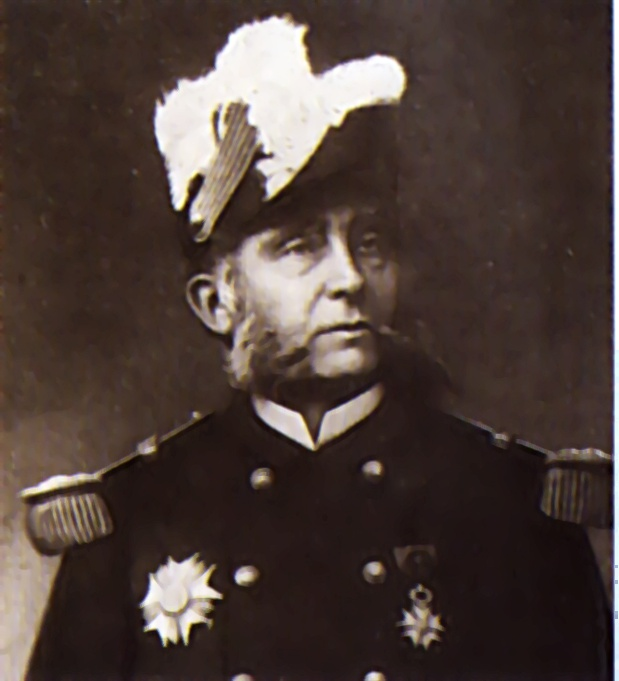
- Born: 23 March 1832; Bordeaux-Les-Rouches, France
- Died: 14 March 1890 (aged 57); Toulon, France
- Military career
- Allegiance: Second French Empire; French Third Republic
- Branch: French Navy
- Service years: 1853–1890
- Rank: Vice-Admiral
- Nickname: Savior of Lima
- Conflicts: Crimean War; Japanese revolution; Franco-Prussian War; War of the Pacific (observer)
- Awards: Légion d'honneur

Abel-Nicolas Georges Henri Bergasse du Petit-Thouars (March 23, 1832 – March 14, 1890) was a French Navy officer who took part in the Crimean War, the Boshin War, the Franco-Prussian War and the War of the Pacific. He is considered a hero in Peru, and is known there as the Savior of Lima.

== Early life ==
Petit-Thouars was born in Bordeaux-en-Gâtinais, Loiret. He was adopted by his maternal uncle Vice Admiral Abel Aubert du Petit-Thouars, a member of the Aubert Du Petit-Thouars family, originating from Touraine, and a noble family since 1711. adding the du Petit-Thouars surname to his name.

When he was 15 years old, he entered the École navale, incorporating himself to the French Navy when he was 21 years old.

== Military career ==
He took part in the Crimean War, where he was wounded and was made a Knight of the Légion d'honneur. In 1868, he commanded the corvette Dupleix during the Japanese revolution. On 8 March 1868, a skiff sent to Sakai was attacked by samurai retainers of the daimyō of Tosa; 11 sailors and a midshipman were killed. The attack and French demands for punishment of the samurai involved became known as the Sakai incident. In 1870, he commanded a floating battery on the Rhine river during the Franco-Prussian War. As a rear admiral, he was in charge of the 1880 pacification of the Marquesas Islands, which had been conquered by his uncle Abel Aubert du Petit-Thouars forty years before.

=== War of the Pacific ===
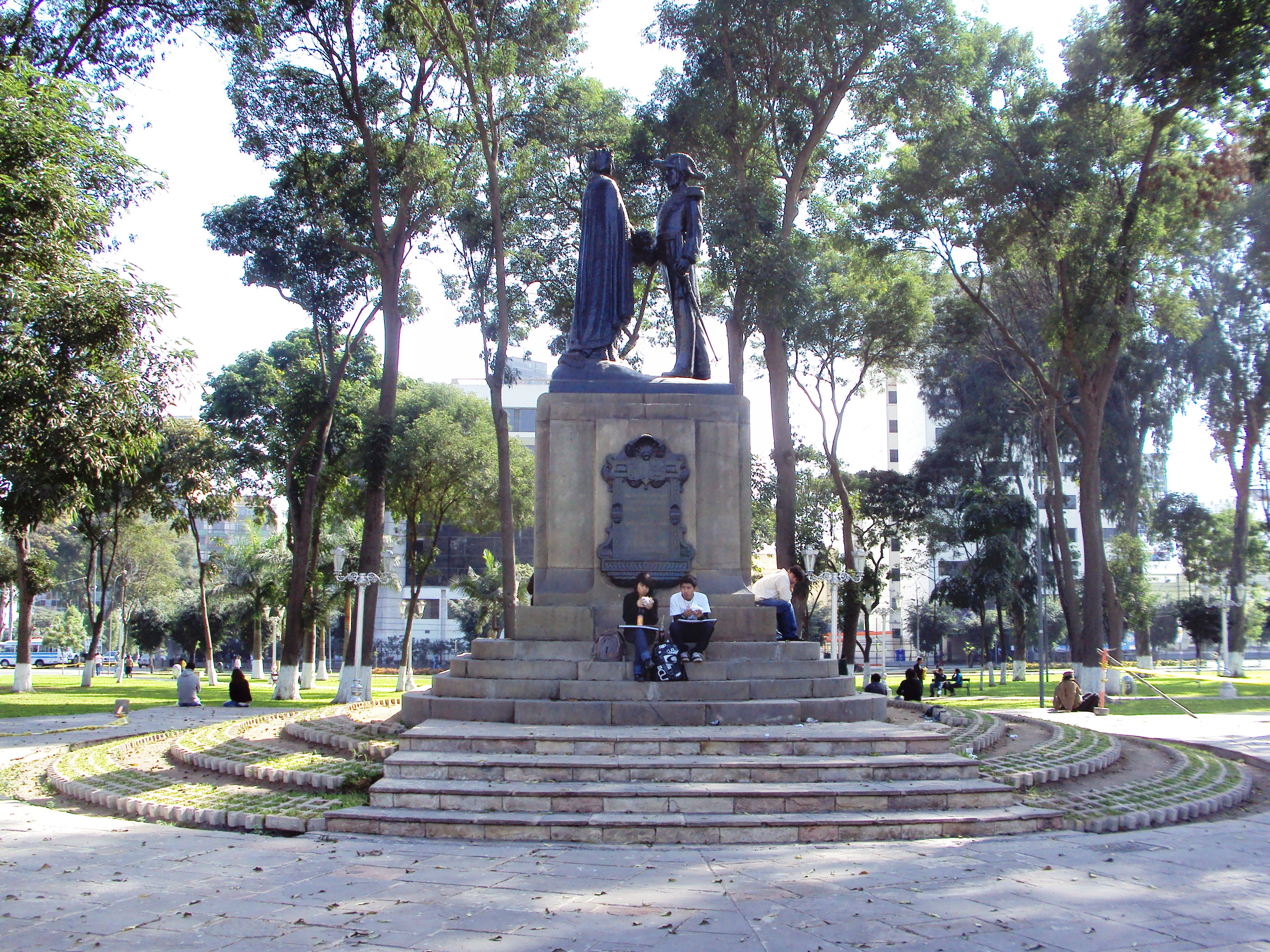
Dupetit-Thouars monument in Lima, Peru

On the way back to France from his mission in the Marquesas Islands, he commanded the French Navy's observation mission at the War of the Pacific. As the Lima campaign saw success after success, and the occupation of Lima became imminent, reports of Chilean destruction resulted in a meeting between the different observing powers, concluding that such an event would not be allowed in Lima proper. His role in the defense of Lima, had the Chilean army attacked the city as it had done in Barranco, Chorrillos and Miraflores, would have been to use his fleet against the occupying army. According to Peruvian historiography, this was accomplished due to Petit-Thouars communicating directly with Chilean commander-in-chief of the occupation, Manuel Baquedano. According to Chilean historiography, however, negotiations were led by Royal Navy admiral J. M. Sterling. Nevertheless, what is known is that Petit-Thouars' role prevented a bombardment of the city.

Because of his role in the war, he became known as the Savior of Lima, and a key south-to-north broad one-way street in Lima, Petit Thouars Avenue, is named after him. It runs through Miraflores, San Isidro, Lince, and downtown Lima.

He was promoted to vice admiral in 1883, and later died in Toulon on 14 March 1890.

== Family ==
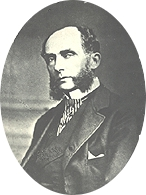
Bergasse du Petit-Thouars in civilian clothes

Great-grand uncles:

- Louis-Marie Aubert du Petit-Thouars (1758–1831), botanist
- Aristide Aubert du Petit-Thouars (1760–1798), French Navy officer, a hero of the Battle of the Nile

Uncle and adoptive father:

- Abel Aubert du Petit-Thouars (1793–1864), French Navy admiral and botanist, took possession of Tahiti for France
