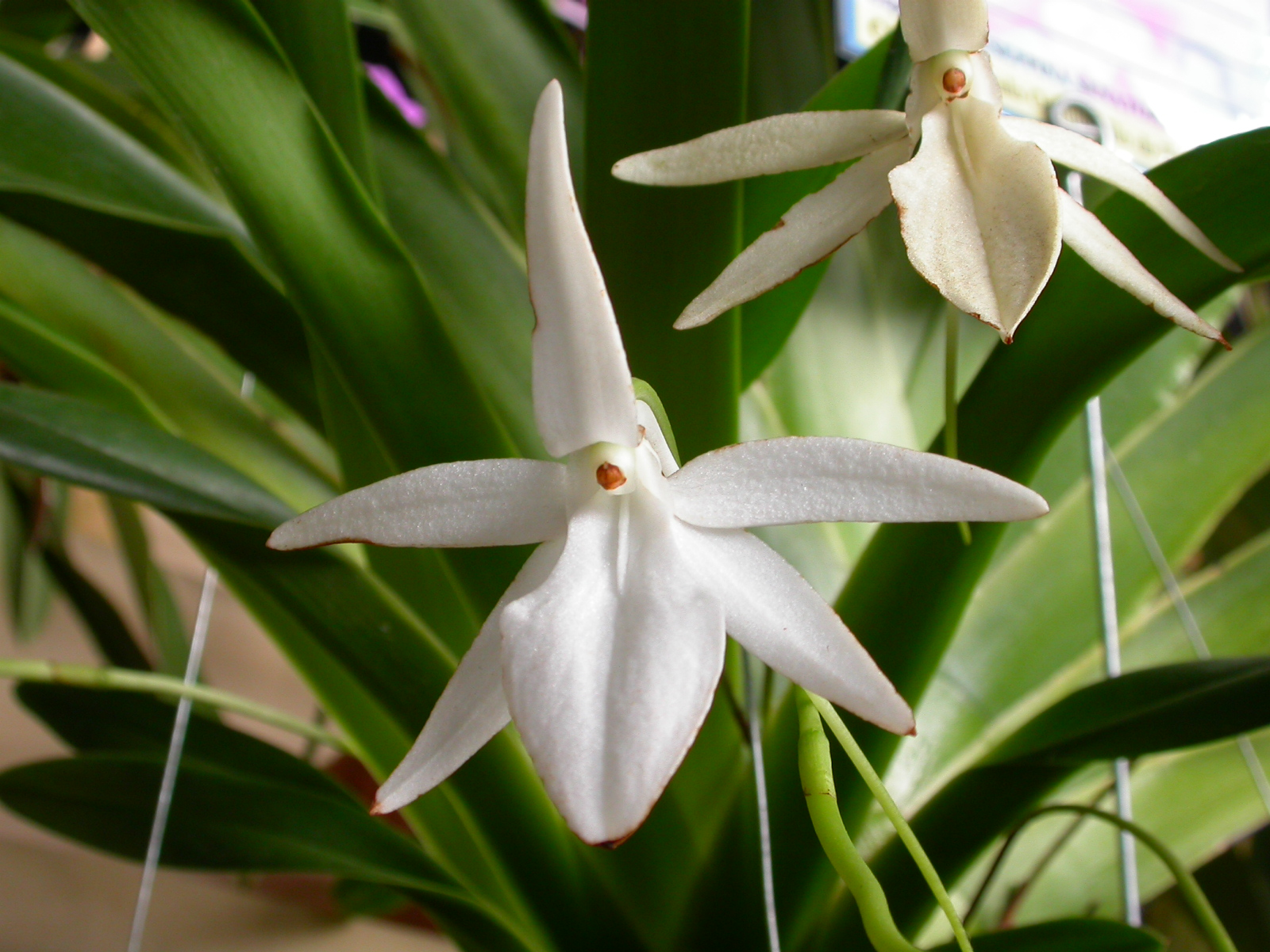

Scientific classification
- Kingdom: Plantae
- Clade: Tracheophytes
- Clade: Angiosperms
- Clade: Monocots
- Order: Asparagales
- Family: Orchidaceae
- Subfamily: Epidendroideae
- Genus: Jumellea
- Species: J. arachnantha

Binomial name
- Jumellea arachnantha (Rchb.f.) Schltr., 1915

Synonyms
- Angraecum gracilipes Rolfe; Jumellea sagittata H. Perrier

= Jumellea arachnantha =

Species of orchid

Jumellea arachnantha (Rchb.f.) Schltr., 1915 is a species of orchid endemic to the Central Highlands of Madagascar and Grande Comore.
