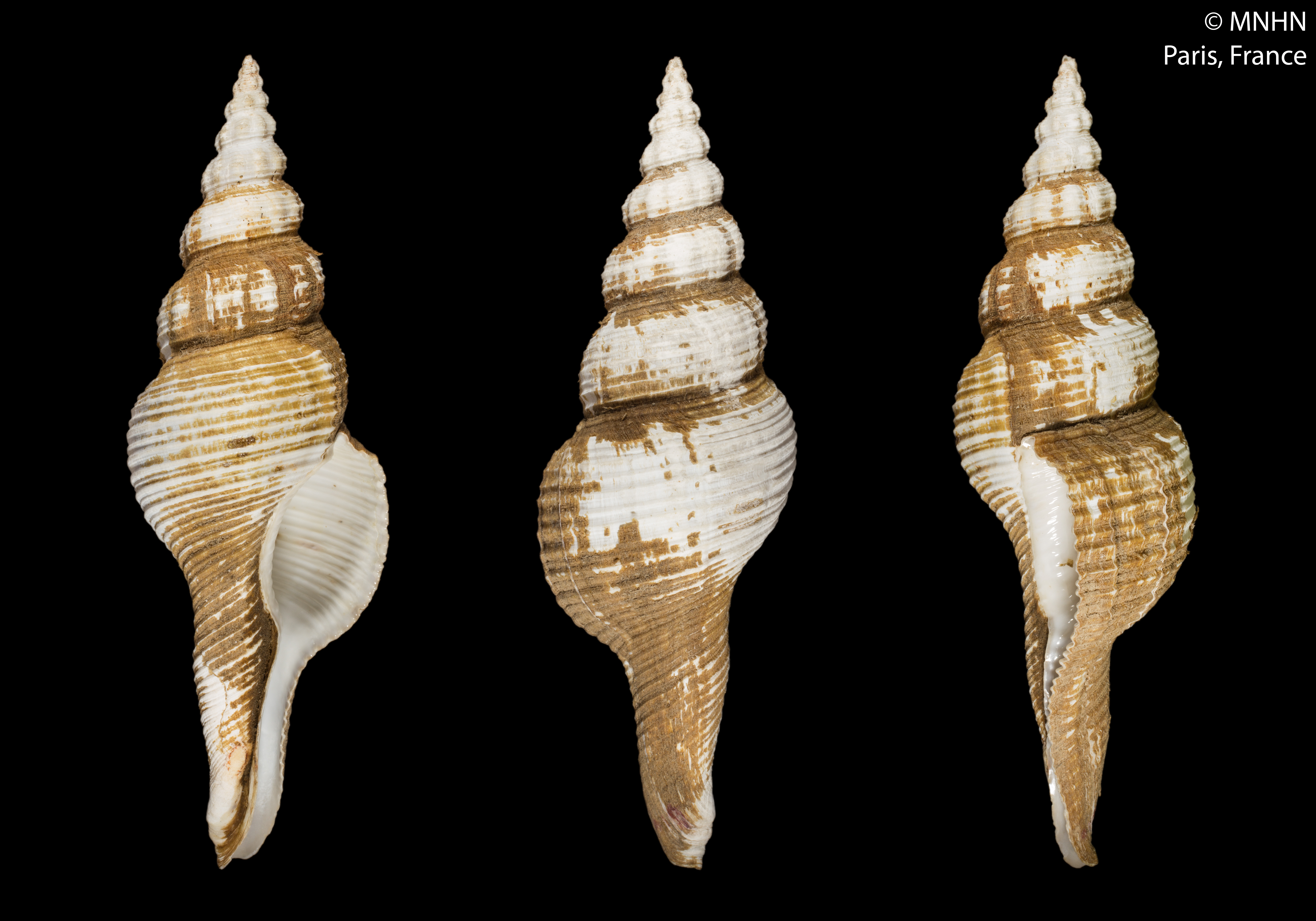
- Shell of Goniofusus turris (syntype at MNHN, Paris)

Scientific classification
- Kingdom: Animalia
- Phylum: Mollusca
- Class: Gastropoda
- Subclass: Caenogastropoda
- Order: Neogastropoda
- Superfamily: Buccinoidea
- Family: Fasciolariidae
- Genus: Goniofusus; Vermeij & Snyder, 2018

Type species
- Fusus dupetitthouarsi Kiener, 1840

= Goniofusus =

Genus of gastropods

Goniofusus is a genus of sea snails, marine gastropod mollusks in the subfamily Fusininae of the family Fasciolariidae, the spindle snails, the tulip snails and their allies.

== Species ==
Species within the genus Goniofusus include:

- † Goniofusus baumanni (Maury, 1925)
- Goniofusus brasiliensis (Grabau, 1904)
- Goniofusus dupetitthouarsi (Kiener, 1840)
- † Goniofusus haitensis (G. B. Sowerby I, 1850)
- Goniofusus spectrum (A. Adams & Reeve, 1848)
- Goniofusus strigatus (Philippi, 1850)
- Goniofusus turris (Valenciennes, 1832)
