= Aristide Aubert du Petit-Thouars =

French Navy officer (1760–1798)

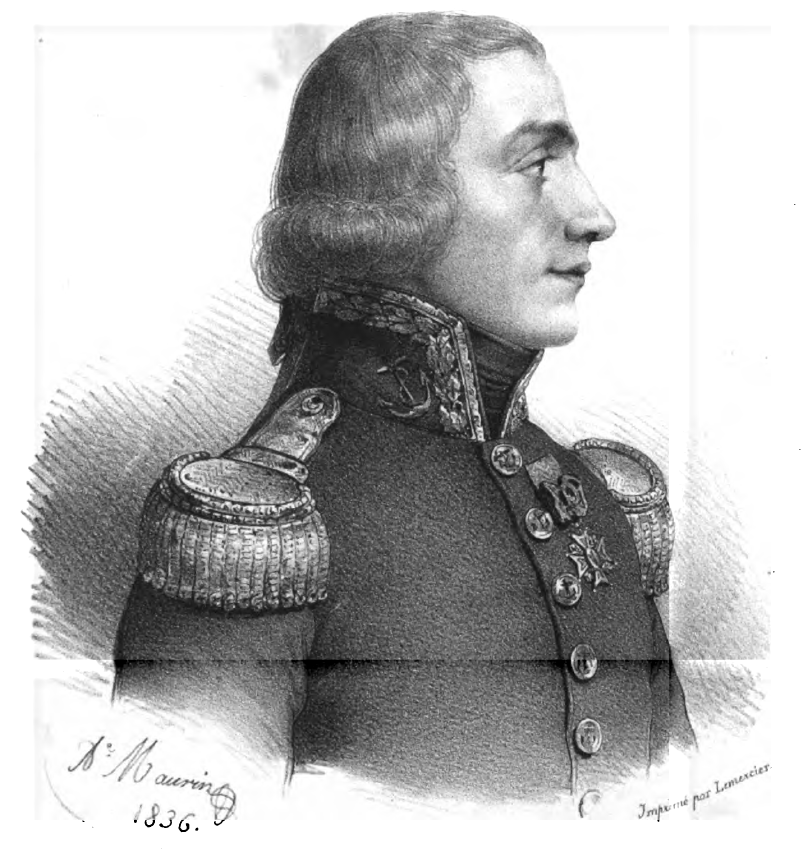
- Portrait by Antoine Maurin, 1836
- Born: 31 August 1760; Boumois, Anjou
- Died: 2 August 1798 (aged 37) Aboukir Bay, Ottoman Egypt
- Allegiance: Kingdom of France; French First Republic
- Branch: French Navy
- Service years: 1778–1798
- Rank: Ship-of-the-line captain
- Conflicts: American Revolutionary War; Battle of Ushant (1778); Battle of Grenada; Battle of the Saintes; French Revolutionary Wars; Battle of the Nile †

Ship-of-the-line Captain Aristide Aubert du Petit-Thouars (31 August 1760 – 2 August 1798) was a French Navy officer who served in the American Revolutionary War and French Revolutionary Wars. During the French invasion of Egypt and Syria, he was killed in action at the Battle of the Nile.

== Life ==
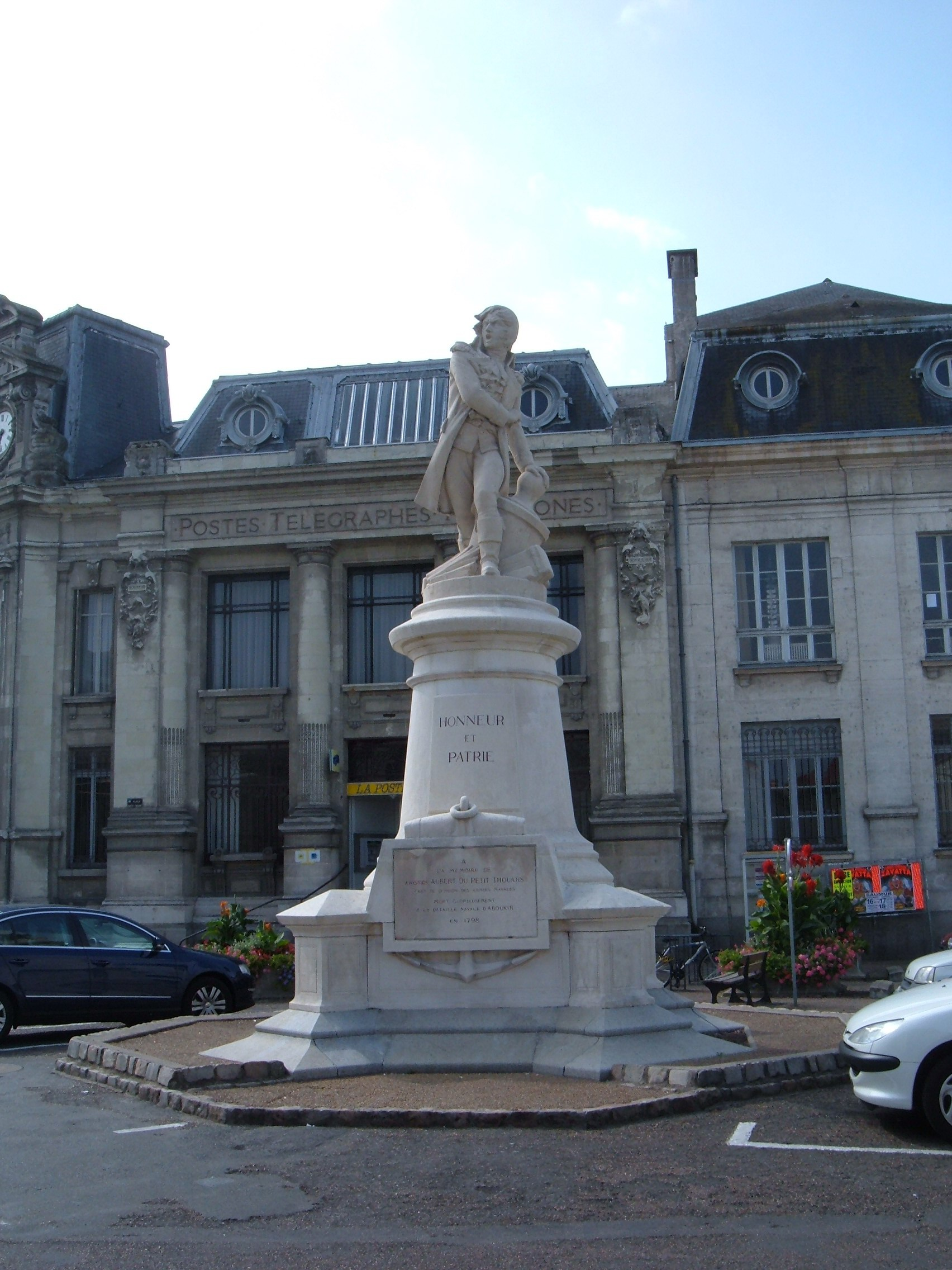
Statue of Petit-Thouars in Saumur

Aristide Aubert du Petit-Thouars was born on 31 August 1760, in Boumois Castle, near Saumur. He studied at the Collège Royal de La Flèche, and entered the French Navy in 1778. He participated that same year in the Battle of Ouessant. He then served in the Antilles, under Luc Urbain de Bouexic, comte de Guichen, against George Brydges Rodney on the 80-gun Couronne. He was at the Battle of the Saintes. He was promoted to lieutenant in 1792. He left that year on board the 12-gun brig Diligent, in search of Jean-François de La Pérouse. In Brazil, he was imprisoned by the Portuguese, but released in 1793. After that he lived for three years in the United States.

Back in France, he was reintegrated—he had become destitute as an aristocrat—and was promoted to captain, commander of the Tonnant at the Battle of the Nile, where he died on 2 August 1798. During the battle, his men heavily battered HMS Majestic, inflicting casualties of 50 killed, including Captain George Blagdon Westcott, and 143 wounded. After having lost both legs and an arm, he continued to command from a bucket filled with wheat until he died. His last order was allegedly to nail the flag of the Tonnant to her mizzen-mast and never to surrender the ship. The Tonnant was eventually captured by the British.

== Family ==
- brother:
  - Louis-Marie Aubert du Petit-Thouars (1758–1831), French botanist
- Their nephew:
  - Abel Ferdinand Aubert du Petit-Thouars (1769-1829), aide-de-camp to General Vignolle, later deputy prefect of Saint-Malo
- Their grandnephew and Abel Ferdinand Aubert's son:
  - Abel Aubert du Petit-Thouars (1793–1864), was a French Navy admiral and botanist, took possession of Tahiti for France.
- Their great-grandnephew and Abel Ferdinand's grandson (by his daughter Sidonie):
  - Abel-Nicolas Bergasse du Petit-Thouars (1832–1890), a French Navy admiral who participated to the Boshin War in Japan.
    - note that Abel-Nicolas Bergasse was Abel Aubert's nephew, but also became his adopted son
