= Goniofusus strigatus =

Scientific classification
- Kingdom: Animalia
- Phylum: Mollusca
- Class: Gastropoda
- Subclass: Caenogastropoda
- Order: Neogastropoda
- Family: Fasciolariidae
- Genus: Goniofusus
- Species: G. strigatus

Binomial name
- Goniofusus strigatus (Philippi, 1850)

Synonyms
- Fusinus strigatus (Philippi, 1850); Fusus strigatus Philippi, 1850 (original combination)

Species of gastropod

Goniofusus strigatus is a species of sea snail, a marine gastropod mollusk in the family Fasciolariidae, the spindle snails, the tulip snails and their allies.

== Description ==
This species attains a size of 84 mm.

== Distribution ==
Western Atlantic: Brazil. Shallow water, in muddy sand, found at low tide.
