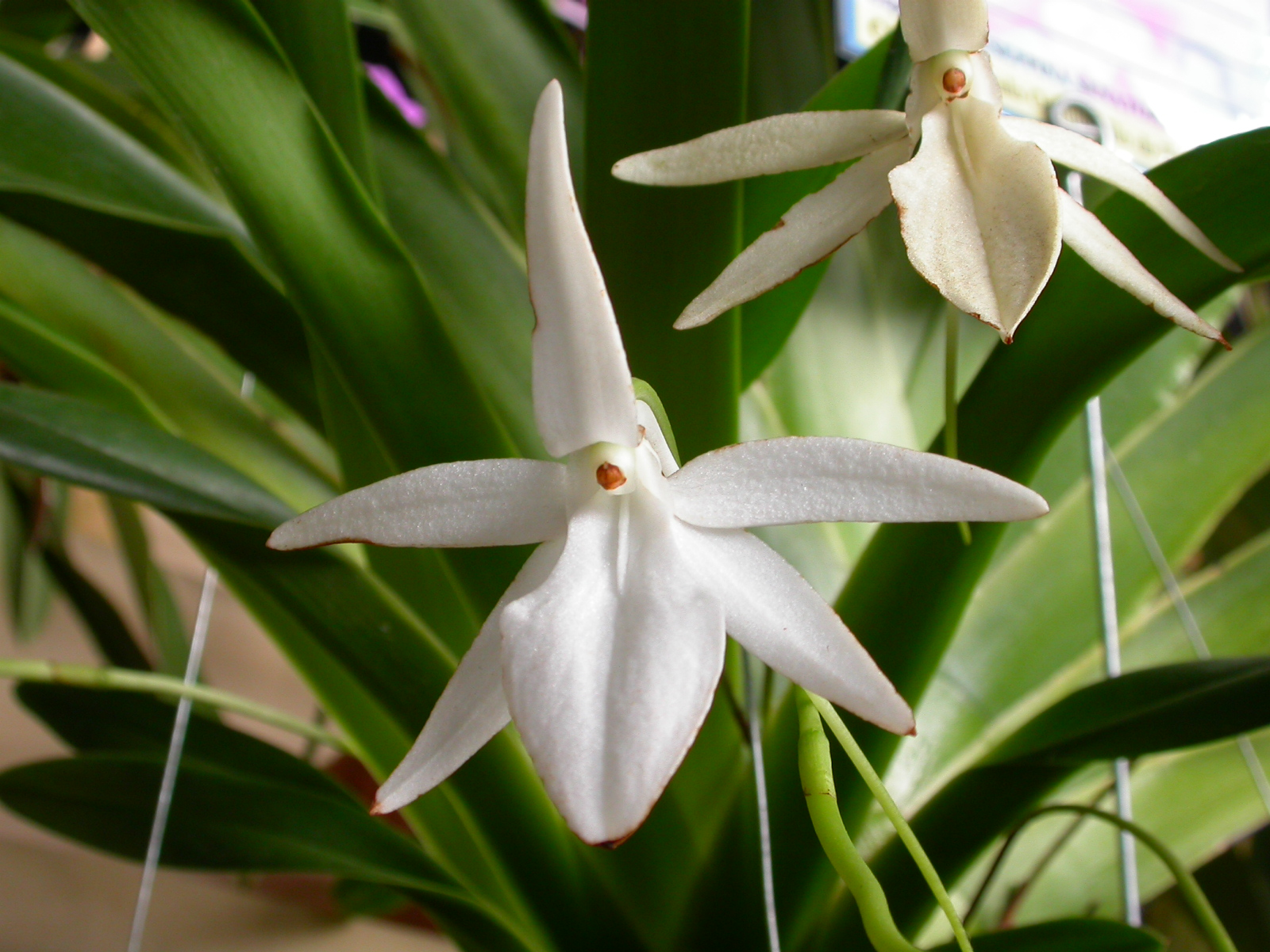
- Flowering Jumellea arachnantha specimen in cultivation
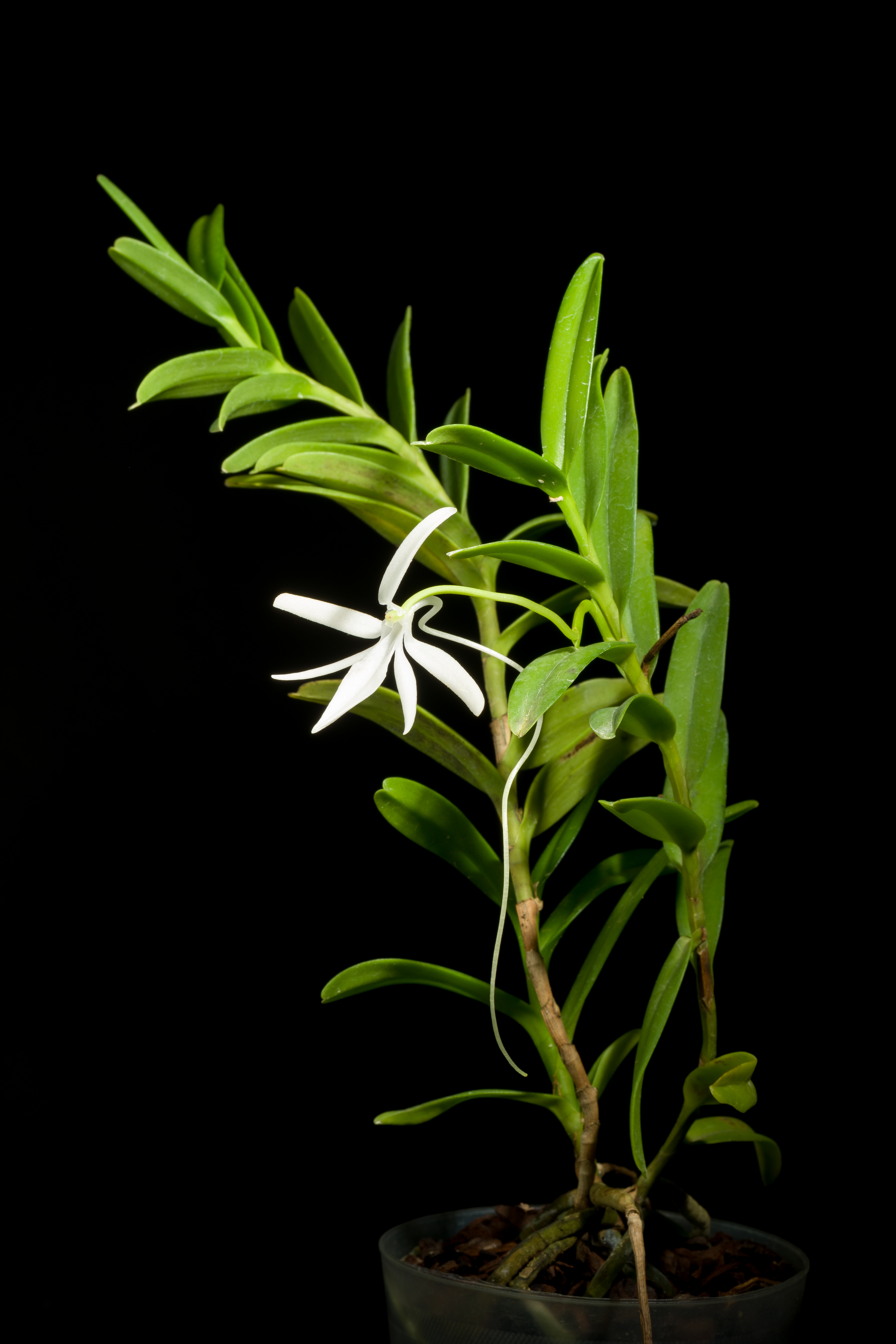
- Flowering Jumellea comorensis specimen in cultivation

Scientific classification
- Kingdom: Plantae
- Clade: Tracheophytes
- Clade: Angiosperms
- Clade: Monocots
- Order: Asparagales
- Family: Orchidaceae
- Subfamily: Epidendroideae
- Tribe: Vandeae
- Subtribe: Angraecinae
- Genus: Jumellea; Schltr.

Species
- See here

= Jumellea =

Genus of orchids

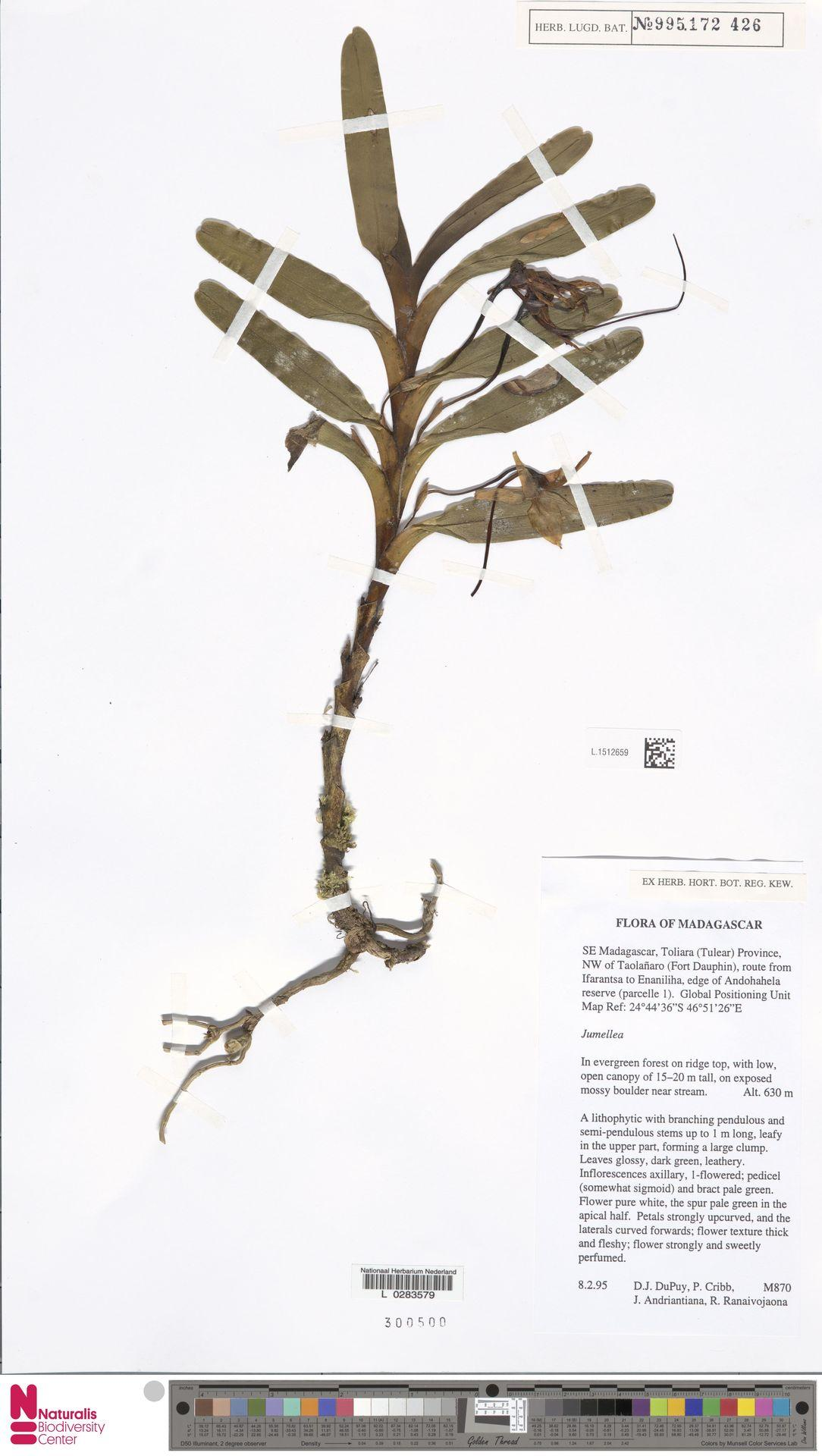
Jumellea alionae P.J.Cribb, herbarium sheet isotype

Jumellea is an orchid genus with 55 species native to Madagascar, the Comoros, the Mascarenes, and eastern Africa.

== Taxonomy ==
It was described by Rudolf Schlechter in 1914.

=== Etymology ===
It is named after Henri Lucien Jumelle, a French botanist.

=== Phylogeny ===
Jumellea is proven to be monophyletic. Jumellea is the sister group to Aeranthes. Both genera together are the sister group to Angraecum:

- - - Aeranthes
    - Jumellea
  - Angraecum

Angraecum evolved into a separate lineage about 9.12 million years ago, and the genera Jumellea and Aeranthes separated about 9.55 million years ago. This means these genera date back to the Miocene.

=== Species ===
- Jumellea alionae P.J.Cribb
- Jumellea ambrensis H.Perrier
- Jumellea amplifolia Schltr.
- Jumellea angustifolia H.Perrier
- Jumellea anjouanensis (Finet) H.Perrier
- Jumellea arachnantha (Rchb.f.) Schltr.
- Jumellea arborescens H.Perrier
- Jumellea bathiei Schltr.
- Jumellea bernetiana J.-B.Castillon
- Jumellea bosseri Pailler
- Jumellea brachycentra Schltr.
- Jumellea brevifolia H.Perrier
- Jumellea comorensis (Rchb.f.) Schltr.
- Jumellea confusa (Schltr.) Schltr.
- Jumellea cowanii (Ridl.) Garay
- Jumellea cyrtoceras Schltr.
- Jumellea dendrobioides Schltr.
- Jumellea densifoliata Senghas
- Jumellea divaricata (Frapp. ex Cordem.) Schltr.
- Jumellea exilis (Cordem.) Schltr.
- Jumellea fragrans (Thouars) Schltr.
- Jumellea francoisii Schltr.
- Jumellea gladiator (Rchb.f.) Schltr.
- Jumellea gregariiflora H.Perrier
- Jumellea hyalina H.Perrier
- Jumellea ibityana Schltr.
- Jumellea intricata H.Perrier
- Jumellea jumelleana (Schltr.) Summerh.
- Jumellea lignosa (Schltr.) Schltr.
- Jumellea linearipetala H.Perrier
- Jumellea longivaginans H.Perrier
- Jumellea majalis (Schltr.) Schltr.
- Jumellea major Schltr.
- Jumellea marojejiensis H.Perrier
- Jumellea maxillarioides (Ridl.) Schltr.
- Jumellea nutans (Frapp. ex Cordem.) Schltr.
- Jumellea ophioplectron (Rchb.f.) Schltr.
- Jumellea pachyceras Schltr.
- Jumellea pachyra (Kraenzl.) H.Perrier
- Jumellea pailleri F.Rakotoar.
- Jumellea papangensis H.Perrier
- Jumellea peyrotii Bosser
- Jumellea phalaenophora (Rchb.f.) Schltr.
- Jumellea porrigens Schltr.
- Jumellea punctata H.Perrier
- Jumellea recta (Thouars) Schltr.
- Jumellea recurva (Thouars) Schltr.
- Jumellea rigida Schltr.
- Jumellea rossii Senghas
- Jumellea similis Schltr.
- Jumellea spathulata (Ridl.) Schltr.
- Jumellea stenoglossa H.Perrier, 1951
- Jumellea stenophylla (Frapp. ex Cordem.) Schltr.
- Jumellea stipitata (Frapp. ex Cordem.) Schltr.
- Jumellea tenuibracteata (H.Perrier) F.P.Rakotoar. & Pailler
- Jumellea teretifolia Schltr.
- Jumellea triquetra (Thouars) Schltr.
- Jumellea usambarensis J.J.Wood
- Jumellea walleri (Rolfe) la Croix
- Jumellea zaratananae Schltr.

== Distribution and habitat ==
It is native to the Comoros, Kenya, South Africa (KwaZulu-Natal, Northern Provinces), Madagascar, Malawi, Mauritius, Mozambique, Rodrigues, Réunion, Tanzania, and Zimbabwe.

== Ecology ==
Jumellea exhibits the typical adaptions to pollination by hawk moths. However, also auto-pollination is known to occur in Jumellea stenophylla.
