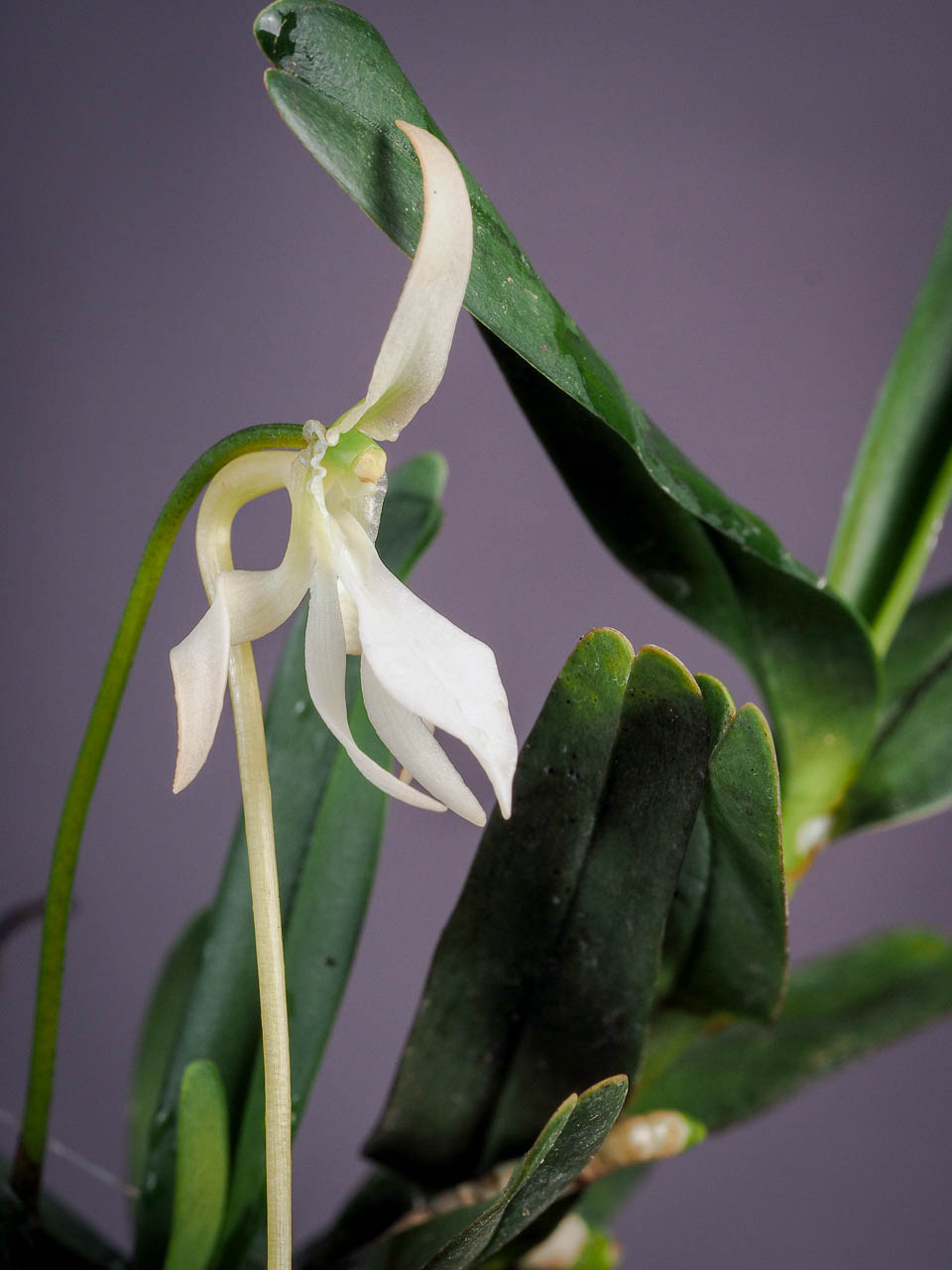

Scientific classification
- Kingdom: Plantae
- Clade: Tracheophytes
- Clade: Angiosperms
- Clade: Monocots
- Order: Asparagales
- Family: Orchidaceae
- Subfamily: Epidendroideae
- Genus: Jumellea
- Species: J. exilis

Binomial name
- Jumellea exilis (Cordem.) Schltr.

= Jumellea exilis =

Species of orchid

Jumellea exilis is a species of flowering plant in the family Orchidaceae, endemic to the island of Réunion.
