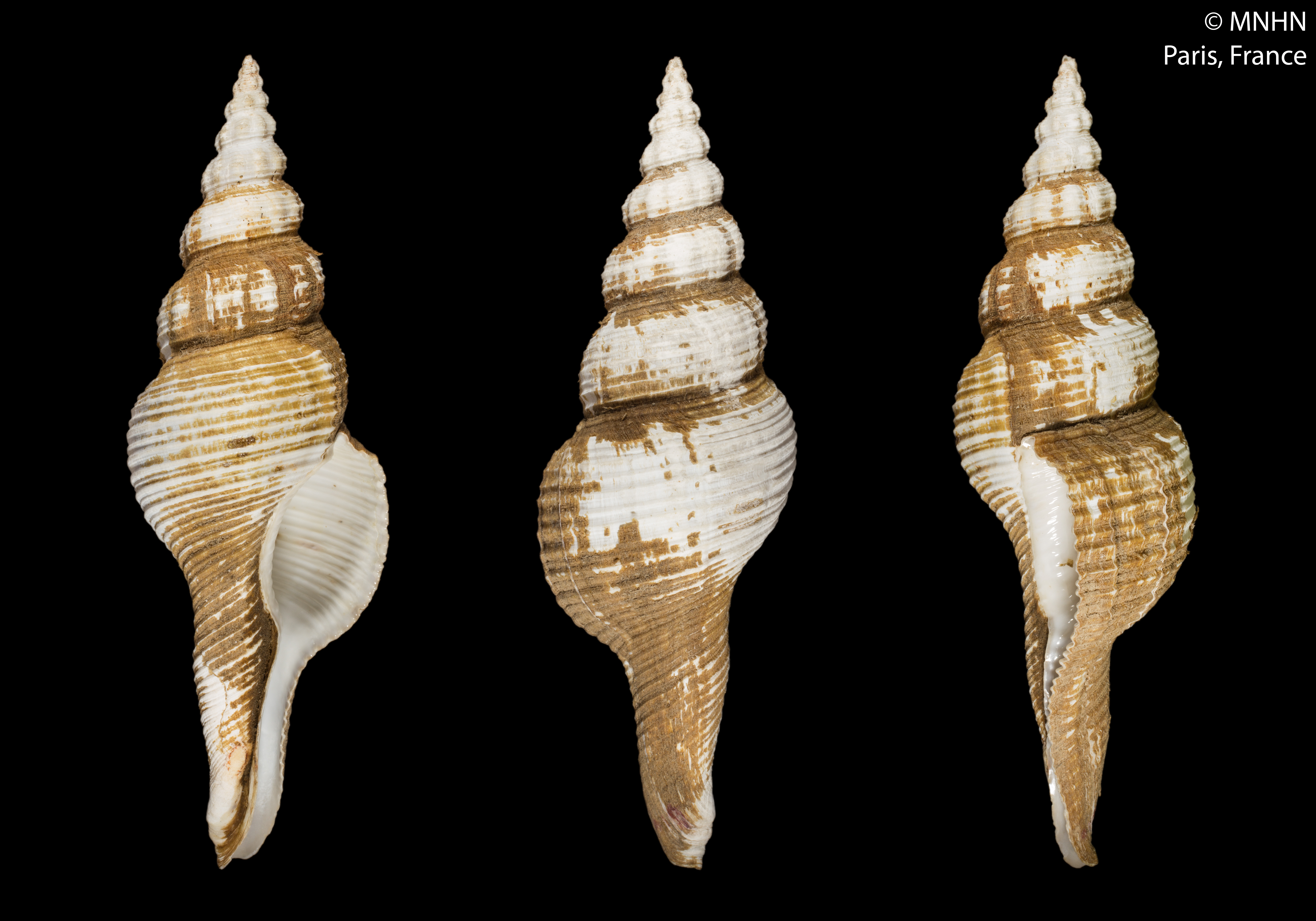
- Shell of Goniofusus turris (syntype at MNHN, Paris)

Scientific classification
- Kingdom: Animalia
- Phylum: Mollusca
- Class: Gastropoda
- Subclass: Caenogastropoda
- Order: Neogastropoda
- Family: Fasciolariidae
- Genus: Goniofusus
- Species: G. turris

Binomial name
- Goniofusus turris (Valenciennes, 1832)

Synonyms
- Fusinus turris (Valenciennes, 1832); Fusus turris Valenciennes, 1832 (original combination)

= Goniofusus turris =

Species of gastropod

Goniofusus turris is a species of sea snail, a marine gastropod mollusk in the family Fasciolariidae, the spindle snails, the tulip snails and their allies.

== Distribution ==
This marine species occurs off Acapulco, Mexico.
