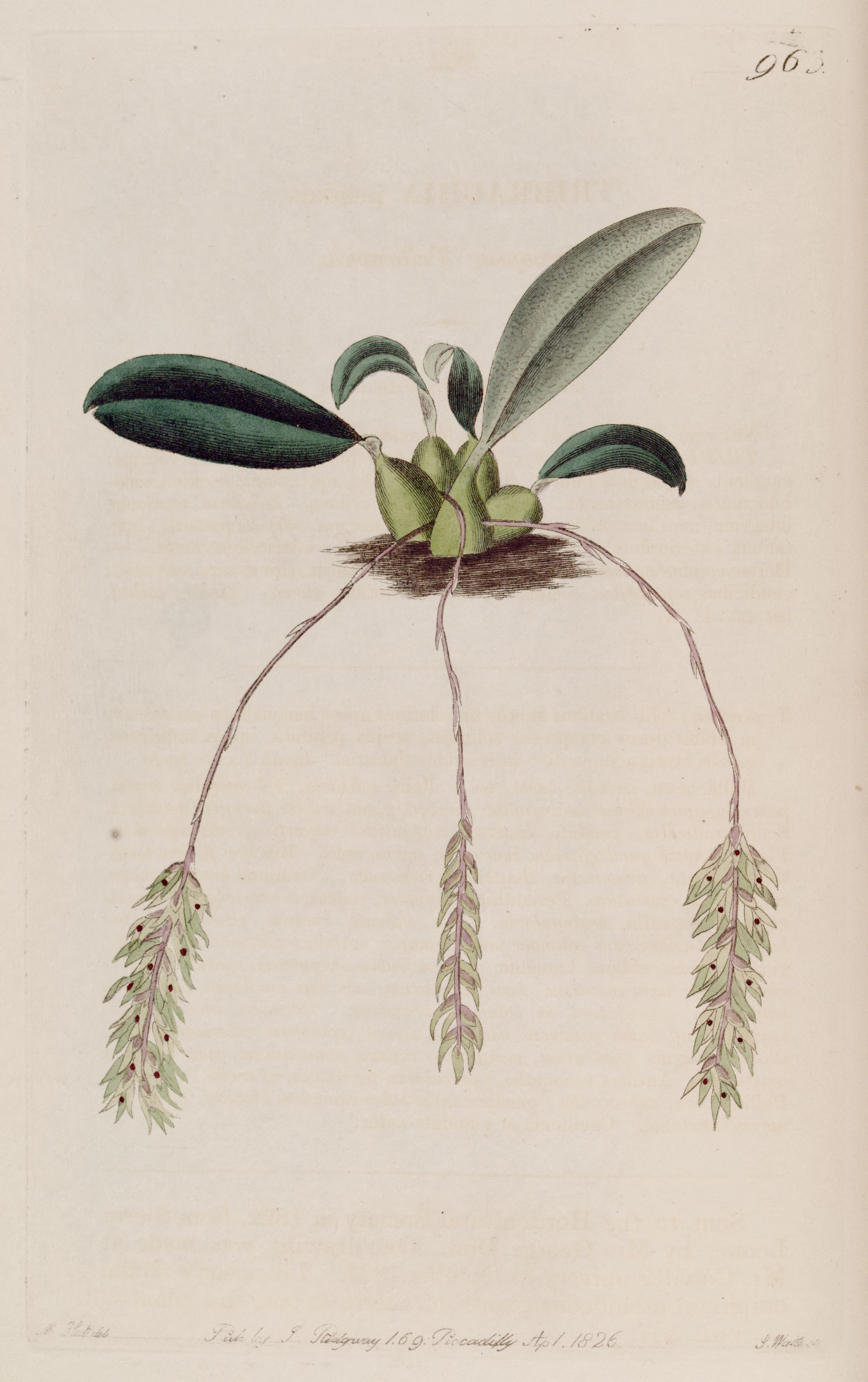

Scientific classification
- Kingdom: Plantae
- Clade: Tracheophytes
- Clade: Angiosperms
- Clade: Monocots
- Order: Asparagales
- Family: Orchidaceae
- Subfamily: Epidendroideae
- Genus: Bulbophyllum
- Species: B. pendulum

Binomial name
- Bulbophyllum pendulum Thouars (1822)

Synonyms
- Tribrachia pendula (Thouars) Lindl. (1826); Phyllorkis pendula (Thouars) Kuntze (1891); Bulbophyllum bernadetteae J.-B.Castillon (2012); Phyllorkis pendiphylis Thouars (1822)

= Bulbophyllum pendulum =

Species of orchid

Bulbophyllum pendulum is a species of orchid.
