= Goniofusus brasiliensis =

Goniofusus braziliensis

Scientific classification
- Kingdom: Animalia
- Phylum: Mollusca
- Class: Gastropoda
- Subclass: Caenogastropoda
- Order: Neogastropoda
- Family: Fasciolariidae
- Genus: Goniofusus
- Species: G. braziliensis

Binomial name
- Goniofusus braziliensis (Grabau, 1904)

Synonyms
- Fusus braziliensis Grabau, 1904; Fusinus braziliensis [sic] (misspelling); Fusus brasiliensis Grabau, 1904 (original combination); Fusus braziliensis Grabau, 1904

Species of gastropod

Goniofusus braziliensis is a species of sea snail, a marine gastropod mollusk in the family Fasciolariidae, the spindle snails, the tulip snails and their allies.

== Description ==
Shell size 90 mm.

== Distribution ==
This species occurs in the Atlantic Ocean off Brazil.

A deep water species, sometimes trawled at 70-80 m. depth.
