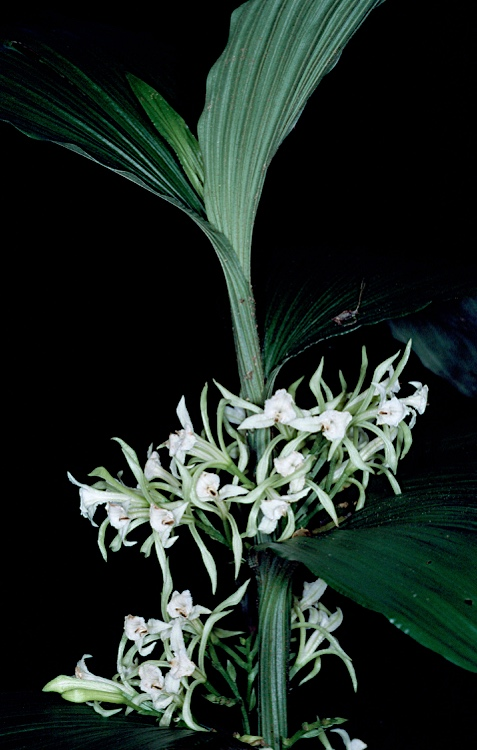
- Corymborkis veratrifolia in the Flecker Botanical Gardens

Scientific classification
- Kingdom: Plantae
- Clade: Tracheophytes
- Clade: Angiosperms
- Clade: Monocots
- Order: Asparagales
- Family: Orchidaceae
- Subfamily: Epidendroideae
- Genus: Corymborkis
- Species: C. veratrifolia

Binomial name
- Corymborkis veratrifolia (Reinw.) Blume

Synonyms
- List: Arundina tahitensis Nadeaud; Chloidia confusa Ames; Corymbis angusta Ridl.; Corymbis batjanica J.J.Sm.; Corymbis brevistylis Hook.f.; Corymbis confusa (Ames) Schltr.; Corymbis disticha (Breda) Lindl.; Corymbis exaltata Schltr.; Corymbis lauterbachii Schltr.; Corymbis ledermannii Schltr.; Corymbis longiflora Hook.f.; Corymbis minor Schltr.; Corymbis rhytidocarpa Hook.f.; Corymbis sakisimensis (Fukuy.) Masam.; Corymbis subdensa Schltr.; Corymbis trukensis Tuyama; Corymbis veratrifolia Rchb.f. nom. inval., pro syn.; Corymborchis angustissima J.J.Sm. orth. var.; Corymborchis parviflora J.J.Sm. orth. var.; Corymborchis ruttenii J.J.Sm. orth. var.; Corymborchis tropidiifolia J.J.Sm. orth. var.; Corymborchis veratrifolia Blume orth. var.; Corymborkis angustissima J.J.Sm.; Corymborkis assamica Blume; Corymborkis batjanica (J.J.Sm.) J.J.Sm.; Corymborkis brevistylis (Hook.f.) Holttum; Corymborkis confusa (Ames) Ames; Corymborkis ledermannii (Schltr.) Fukuy.; Corymborkis longiflora (Hook.f.) Burkill; Corymborkis parviflora J.J.Sm.; Corymborkis rhytidocarpa (Hook.f.) Holttum; Corymborkis ruttenii J.J.Sm.; Corymborkis sakisimensis Fukuy.; Corymborkis subdensa (Schltr.) Fukuy.; Corymborkis tropidiiflora Dockrill orth. var.; Corymborkis tropidiifolia J.J.Sm.; Corymborkis trukensis (Tuyama) Fukuy.; Corymborkis veratrifolia (Reinw.) Blume var. veratrifolia; Hysteria veratrifolia Blume nom. inval., nom. nud.; Hysteria veratrifolia Reinw.; Macrostylis disticha Breda; Rhynchanthera paniculata Blume; Corymbis thouarsii auct. non Rchb.f.: Kraenzlin, F.W.L. in Schumann, K. & Lauterbach, K. (1900)

= Corymborkis veratrifolia =

White cinnamon orchid

Species of orchid

Corymborkis veratrifolia, commonly known as the white cinnamon orchid is a plant in the orchid family and is native to areas from tropical and subtropical Asia to Australia and the Pacific Islands. It is an evergreen, terrestrial orchid with a thin, upright stem, papery, pleated leaves and a short flowering stems with up to sixty crowded, short-lived green and white flowers.

== Description ==
Corymborkis veratrifolia is a terrestrial, evergreen herb that forms clumps and has thin rhizomes and thin, upright, unbranched, wiry stems 0.5–1.5 m (2–5 ft) tall. There are between six and fifteen narrow elliptic leaves 200–300 mm (8–10 in) long and 70–100 mm (3–4 in) wide. The leaves are dark green, thin-textured and corrugated. Between twenty and sixty short-lived, cinnamon-scented flowers are crowded along the branched flowering stem, the flowers 20–25 mm (0.8–1 in) wide. The sepals are green, linear to lance-shaped or spatula-shaped, 32–38 mm (1.3–1.5 in) long and 2–3 mm (0.08–0.1 in) wide. The petals are white, 25–30 mm (0.98–1.2 in) long, 3–4 mm (0.1–0.2 in) wide and wavy. The labellum is pale white, 20–25 mm (0.8–1 in) long and 8–12 mm (0.3–0.5 in) wide with a narrow tube-shaped base and a broad egg-shaped end with wavy edges. Flowering occurs between December and March in Australia, December to July in New Guinea and in July in China.

== Taxonomy and naming ==
The white cinnamon orchid was first formally described in 1825 by Caspar Georg Carl Reinwardt who gave it the name Hysteria veratrifolia and published the description in Sylloge Plantarum Novarum Itemque Minus Cognitarum a Praestantissimis Botanicis adhuc Viventibus Collecta et a Societate Regia Botanica Ratisbonensi Edita. Later the same year, Carl Ludwig Blume changed the name to Corymborkis veratrifolia. The specific epithet (veratrifolia) is derived from the Latin words veratrum meaning "hellebore" and folia meaning "leaves".

== Distribution and habitat ==
Corymborkis veratrifolia grows in shady places in forest and rainforest in China, Taiwan, Cambodia, India, Indonesia, the Ryukyu Islands, Laos, Malaysia, Myanmar, Sri Lanka, Thailand, Vietnam, islands in the south west Pacific and northern Australia. In Australia it is found between the Iron Range and Airlie Beach in Queensland.
