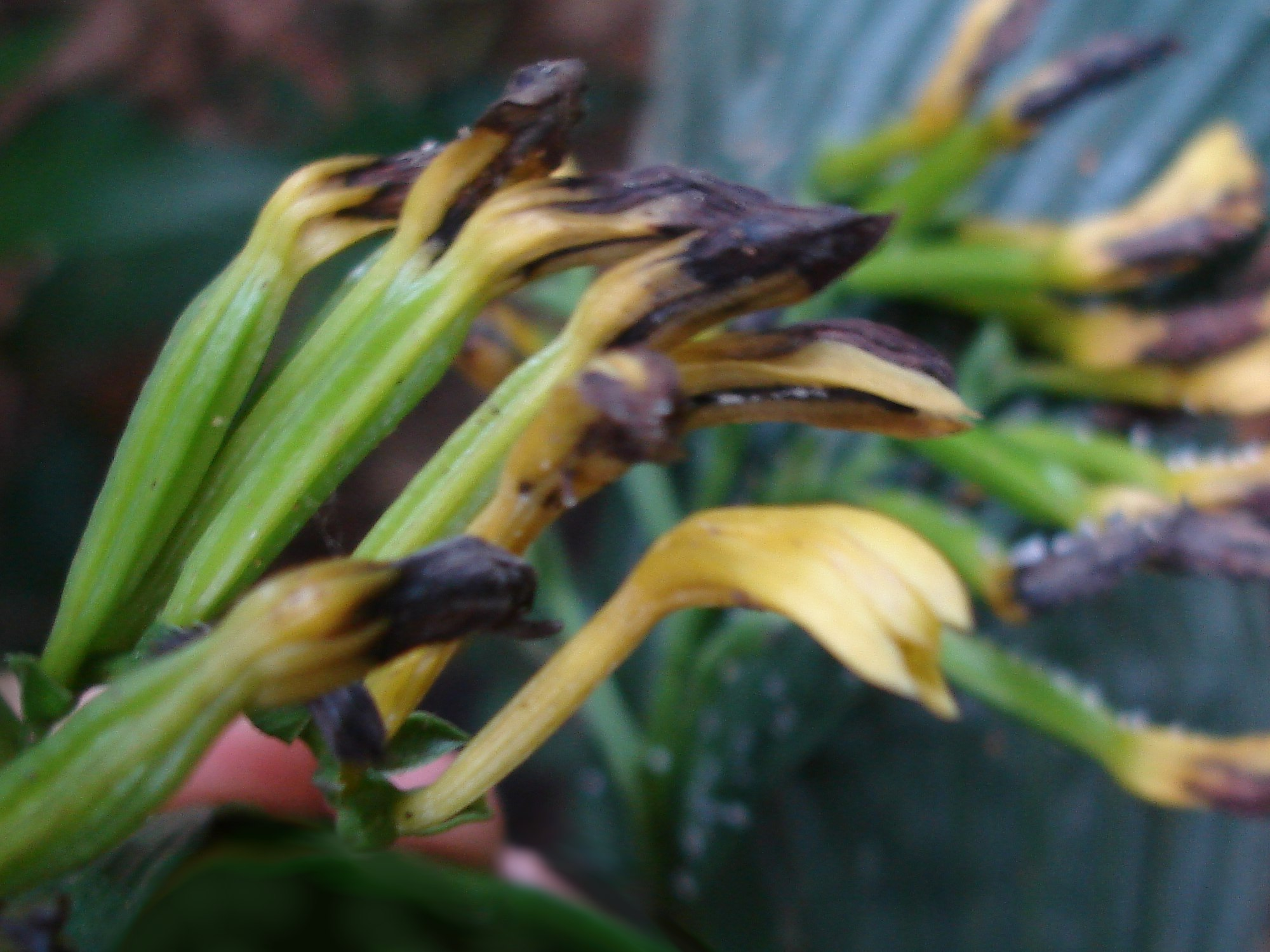
- Corymborkis flava

Scientific classification
- Kingdom: Plantae
- Clade: Tracheophytes
- Clade: Angiosperms
- Clade: Monocots
- Order: Asparagales
- Family: Orchidaceae
- Subfamily: Epidendroideae
- Tribe: Tropidieae
- Genus: Corymborkis; Thouars

Synonyms
- Corymbis Thouars; Corymborchis Thouars ex Blume; Hysteria Reinw.; Macrostylis Breda; Rhynchandra Rchb.; Rynchanthera Blume; Tomotris Raf.

= Corymborkis =

Cinnamon orchids

Genus of plants

Corymborkis, commonly known as cinnamon orchids, or 管花兰属 (guan hua lan shu) is a genus of eight species of orchids in the family Orchidaceae. They are evergreen, terrestrial plants which grow in clumps and have thin roots, leafy stems, pleated leaves and widely-opening flowers with thin, spreading sepals and petals. They are widely distributed in the tropics.

== Description ==
Orchids in the genus Corymborkis are terrestrial, evergreen herbs which often grow in clumps and have short rhizomes and thin, wiry stems. One or more thin, unbranched stems arise from the same rhizome and have many papery, pleated, egg-shaped to elliptic leaves near their top half. A branching flowering stem develops from the upper leaf axils and carry crowded, widely-opening flowers. The flowers are greenish white and usually have thin, spreading sepals and petals which are similar to each other, with the petals slightly wider than the sepals. The labellum is about as long as the sepals, closely surrounds the column and has a tube-like base and two longitudinal ridges.

== Taxonomy and naming ==
The genus Corymborkis was first formally described in 1809 by Louis-Marie Aubert du Petit-Thouars and the description was published in Bulletin de la Société philomathique de Paris. The name Corymborkis is derived from the Ancient Greek words korymbos meaning "bunch of flowers or fruit" and orchis meaning "testicle" or "orchid", referring to the bunched flowers of these orchids.

== Distribution and habitat ==
Orchids in this genus are found in tropical Africa, India, Sri Lanka, Thailand, Malaysia, the Philippines, Indonesia, New Guinea and Australia, including on Christmas Island. They usually grow in moist, shady places in rainforest.

== List of species ==
The following is a list of species of Corymborkis recognised by Plants of the World Online as at October 2025:

- Corymborkis corymbis Thouars - Africa from Guinea to Ethiopia to South Africa; Madagascar, Mauritius, Réunion
- Corymborkis flava (Sw.) Kuntze - South America, Central America, Cuba, Jamaica
- Corymborkis forcipigera (Rchb.f. & Warsz.) L.O.Williams - Mexico, Central America, West Indies, Colombia
- Corymborkis galipanensis (Rchb.f.) Foldats - Venezuela
- Corymborkis guyanensis Szlach. S.Nowak & Baranow - Guyana
- Corymborkis harlingii Szlach. & Kolan - Colombia to Ecuador
- Corymborkis minima P.J.Cribb - Cameroon, Equatorial Guinea
- Corymborkis veratrifolia (Reinw.) Blume - China, Indian Subcontinent, Southeast Asia, New Guinea, Queensland, Pacific Islands
