= Bulbophyllum rubrum =

Conservation status
- Vulnerable (IUCN 3.1)

Scientific classification
- Kingdom: Plantae
- Clade: Tracheophytes
- Clade: Angiosperms
- Clade: Monocots
- Order: Asparagales
- Family: Orchidaceae
- Subfamily: Epidendroideae
- Genus: Bulbophyllum
- Species: B. rubrum

Binomial name
- Bulbophyllum rubrum Jum. & H.Perrier

Synonyms
- Bulbophyllum ambongense Schltr. 1924

Species of orchid

Bulbophyllum rubrum is a species of orchid in the genus Bulbophyllum.
