= Bulbophyllum porphyrostachys =

Conservation status
- Near Threatened (IUCN 2.3)

Scientific classification
- Kingdom: Plantae
- Clade: Tracheophytes
- Clade: Angiosperms
- Clade: Monocots
- Order: Asparagales
- Family: Orchidaceae
- Subfamily: Epidendroideae
- Genus: Bulbophyllum
- Species: B. porphyrostachys

Binomial name
- Bulbophyllum porphyrostachys Summerh.

Species of orchid

Bulbophyllum porphyrostachys is a species of plant in the family Orchidaceae. It is found in Cameroon, the Republic of the Congo, and Nigeria. It was botanically described in 1951.

Although the distribution of B. porphyrostachys is widespread; from Southern Nigeria (in Okuma, Sapoba and Usonigbe Forest Reserves, and in Calabar) to Cameroon (specifically on Mount Cameroon) and Congo-Brazzaville; it is found only sporadically, as either an epiphyte, or a lithophyte (on lava rock). It has not been observed as the latter recently (1995 survey).
