= Bulbophyllum bicoloratum =

- 3D model of a Bulbophyllum bicoloratum flower

Scientific classification
- Kingdom: Plantae
- Clade: Tracheophytes
- Clade: Angiosperms
- Clade: Monocots
- Order: Asparagales
- Family: Orchidaceae
- Subfamily: Epidendroideae
- Genus: Bulbophyllum
- Species: B. bicoloratum

Binomial name
- Bulbophyllum bicoloratum Schltr.

Synonyms
- Bulbophyllum bicolor Jum. & H.Perrier; Bulbophyllum theiochlamys Schltr.; Bulbophyllum coeruleum H.Perrier

Species of orchid

Bulbophyllum bicoloratum is a species of orchid in the genus Bulbophyllum.
