= Bulbophyllum densum =

Scientific classification
- Kingdom: Plantae
- Clade: Tracheophytes
- Clade: Angiosperms
- Clade: Monocots
- Order: Asparagales
- Family: Orchidaceae
- Subfamily: Epidendroideae
- Genus: Bulbophyllum
- Species: B. densum

Binomial name
- Bulbophyllum densum Thouars

Synonyms
- Bulbophyllum mascarenense Pailler and Baider 2020; Phyllorkis densophylis Thouars 1822; Phyllorkis densa (Thouars) Kuntze 1891

Species of orchid

Bulbophyllum densum is a species of orchid in the genus Bulbophyllum.
