= Bulbophyllum erectum =

Scientific classification
- Kingdom: Plantae
- Clade: Tracheophytes
- Clade: Angiosperms
- Clade: Monocots
- Order: Asparagales
- Family: Orchidaceae
- Subfamily: Epidendroideae
- Genus: Bulbophyllum
- Species: B. erectum

Binomial name
- Bulbophyllum erectum Thouars, 1822

Synonyms
- Bulbophyllum lobulatum Schltr. 1924; Bulbophyllum calamarioides Schltr. 1924

Species of orchid

Bulbophyllum erectum is a species of orchid in the genus Bulbophyllum.
