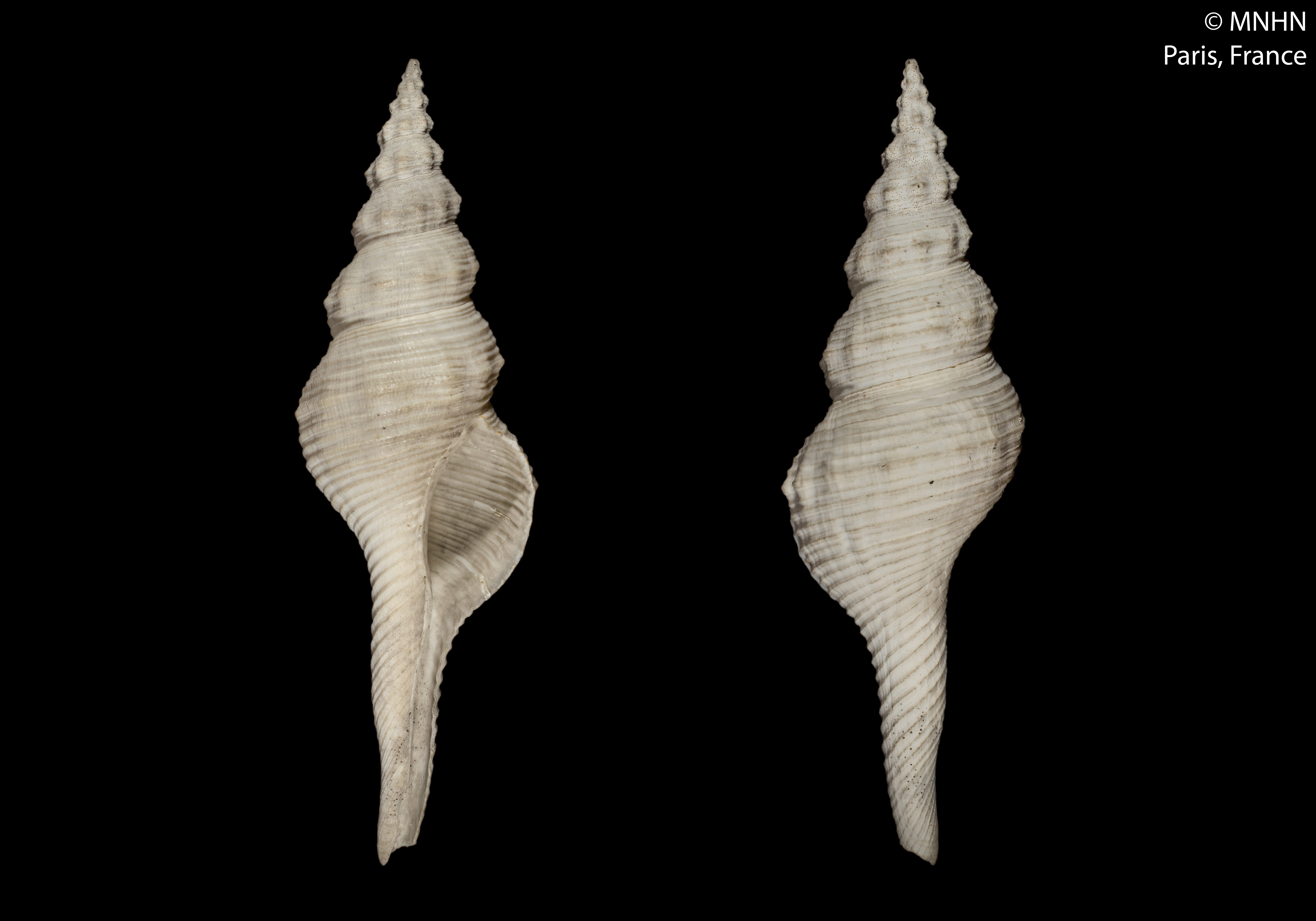
- Shell of Goniofusus dupetitthouarsi (holotype at MNHN, Paris)

Scientific classification
- Kingdom: Animalia
- Phylum: Mollusca
- Class: Gastropoda
- Subclass: Caenogastropoda
- Order: Neogastropoda
- Family: Fasciolariidae
- Genus: Goniofusus
- Species: G. dupetitthouarsi

Binomial name
- Goniofusus dupetitthouarsi (Kiener, 1840)

Synonyms
- Falsifusus dupetitthouarsi Kiener, 1840; Fusinus dupetitthouarsi (Kiener, 1840); Fusus dupetitthouarsi Kiener, 1840; Fusus funiculatus Lesson, 1842

= Goniofusus dupetitthouarsi =

Species of gastropod

Goniofusus dupetitthouarsi is a species of sea snail, a marine gastropod mollusk in the family Fasciolariidae, the spindle snails, containing the tulip snails and their allies.

== Description ==
The length of the shell attains 200–250 mm. Though large specimens do exist, with one being as much as 250 mm (10 inches). They are also known as the Giant Spindle and the Ornamented Spindle and in Mexico as tulipa’n blanco. The shell is broad and relatively elongated with a widely open siphonal canal with the distal opening of the canal slightly flaring. Goniofusus Dupetitthouarsi also have large apertures. They have of eight to ten angular whorls with the lower whorls being marked with knobs, and a very high spiral. In contrast to other Spindles in the area have a more sinuous canal. The shell is sculpted with coarse lines spiraling along the whorls and short axial ribs forming spirally elongated tubercles on well-marked peripheral cords. The exterior of the shell is white and they are covered with a yellowish-brown to greenish-brown periostracum.

== Distribution ==
Pacific Ocean: West coast of The Americas.

This species occurs in the outer coast of Baja California, throughout the Gulf of California and south to Ecuador including Galápagos Islands and Peru. They are found within sand and muddy sand substrates from the intertidal zone to depths up to 55 m or 180 feet.
