= Bulbophyllum liparidioides =

Scientific classification
- Kingdom: Plantae
- Clade: Tracheophytes
- Clade: Angiosperms
- Clade: Monocots
- Order: Asparagales
- Family: Orchidaceae
- Subfamily: Epidendroideae
- Genus: Bulbophyllum
- Species: B. liparidioides

Binomial name
- Bulbophyllum liparidioides Schltr.

Synonyms
- The Liparis-Like Bulbophyllum

Species of orchid

Bulbophyllum liparidioides is a species of orchid in the genus Bulbophyllum. These rare orchids are native to Madagascar.
