= Bulbophyllum pentastichum =

Scientific classification
- Kingdom: Plantae
- Clade: Tracheophytes
- Clade: Angiosperms
- Clade: Monocots
- Order: Asparagales
- Family: Orchidaceae
- Subfamily: Epidendroideae
- Genus: Bulbophyllum
- Species: B. pentastichum

Binomial name
- Bulbophyllum pentastichum (Pfitzer ex Kraenzl.) Schltr.

Synonyms
- Bulbophyllum matitanense H.Perrier 1937

Species of orchid

Bulbophyllum pentastichum is a species of orchid in the genus Bulbophyllum.
