= Bulbophyllum humblotii =

Scientific classification
- Kingdom: Plantae
- Clade: Tracheophytes
- Clade: Angiosperms
- Clade: Monocots
- Order: Asparagales
- Family: Orchidaceae
- Subfamily: Epidendroideae
- Genus: Bulbophyllum
- Species: B. humblotii

Binomial name
- Bulbophyllum humblotii Rolfe

Synonyms
- Bulbophyllum album Jum. & H.Perrier 1912

Species of orchid

Bulbophyllum humblotii is a species of orchid in the genus Bulbophyllum.
