= Bordeaux-en-Gâtinais =

- Commune
- Coat of arms
- Location of Bordeaux-en-Gâtinais
- Location within France Location within Centre-Val de Loire
- Coordinates: 48°05′59″N 2°31′40″E
- Country: France
- Region: Centre-Val de Loire
- Department: Loiret
- Arrondissement: Pithiviers
- Canton: Le Malesherbois
- Intercommunality: Pithiverais-Gâtinais

Government
  - Mayor (2020–2026): Francis Bougreau
- Area^{1}: 9.46 km^{2} (3.65 sq mi)
- Highest elevation: 96 m (315 ft)
- Lowest elevation: 79 m (259 ft)
- Population (2023): 108
  - Density: 11.4/km^{2} (29.6/sq mi)
- Time zone: UTC+01:00 (CET)
  - Summer (DST): UTC+02:00 (CEST)
- INSEE/Postal code: 45041 /45340
- ^{1} French Land Register data, which excludes lakes, ponds, glaciers > 1 km^{2} (0.386 sq mi or 247 acres) and river estuaries.

Bordeaux-en-Gâtinais (French pronunciation: [bɔʁdo ɑ̃ ɡɑtinɛ]; literally "Bordeaux in Gâtinais") is a commune in the Loiret department in north-central France.

== Population ==
Historical population
Year	Pop.	±% p.a.
1968	159	—
1975	147	−1.11%
1982	116	−3.33%
1990	121	+0.53%
1999	122	+0.09%
2007	116	−0.63%
2012	116	+0.00%
2017	112	−0.70%
2023	108	−0.60%
Source: INSEE

== See also ==
- Communes of the Loiret department
