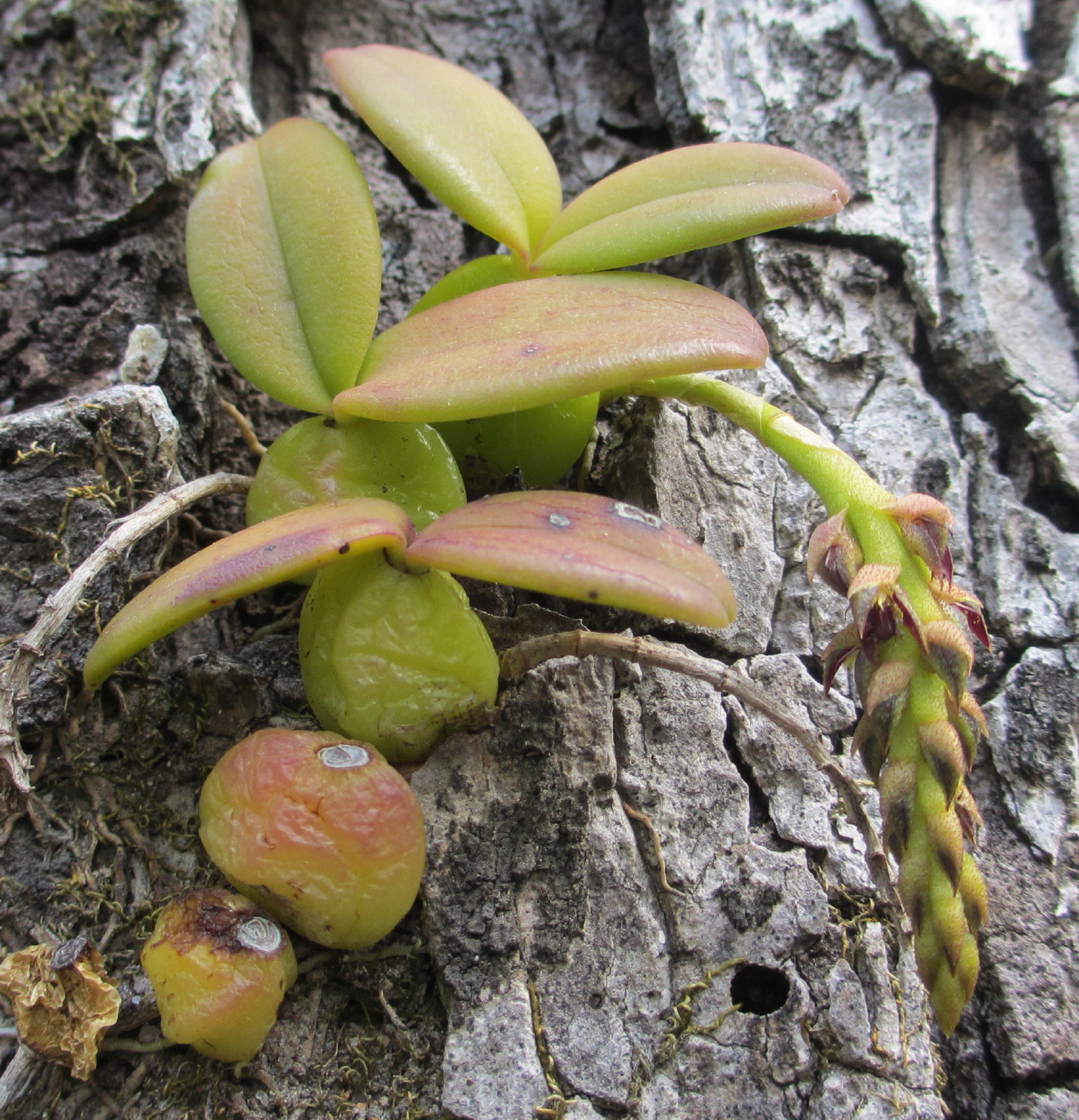

Scientific classification
- Kingdom: Plantae
- Clade: Tracheophytes
- Clade: Angiosperms
- Clade: Monocots
- Order: Asparagales
- Family: Orchidaceae
- Subfamily: Epidendroideae
- Genus: Bulbophyllum
- Species: B. elliotii

Binomial name
- Bulbophyllum elliotii Rolfe

Synonyms
- Bulbophyllum malawiense B.Morris 1968; Bulbophyllum sambiranense Jum. & H.Perrier 1916

= Bulbophyllum elliotii =

Bulbophyllum elliottii

Species of orchid

Bulbophyllum elliotii is a species of orchid in the genus Bulbophyllum.
