= Bulbophyllum quadrifarium =

Scientific classification
- Kingdom: Plantae
- Clade: Embryophytes
- Clade: Tracheophytes
- Clade: Spermatophytes
- Clade: Angiosperms
- Clade: Monocots
- Order: Asparagales
- Family: Orchidaceae
- Subfamily: Epidendroideae
- Genus: Bulbophyllum
- Species: B. quadrifarium

Binomial name
- Bulbophyllum quadrifarium Rolfe

Species of orchid

Bulbophyllum quadrifarium is a species of orchid in the genus Bulbophyllum.The species Bulbophyllum quadrifarium itself is part of the genus Bulbophyllum. The scientific name of this species was first published by Rolfe in 1903.
