= Louis-Marie Aubert du Petit-Thouars =

French botanist

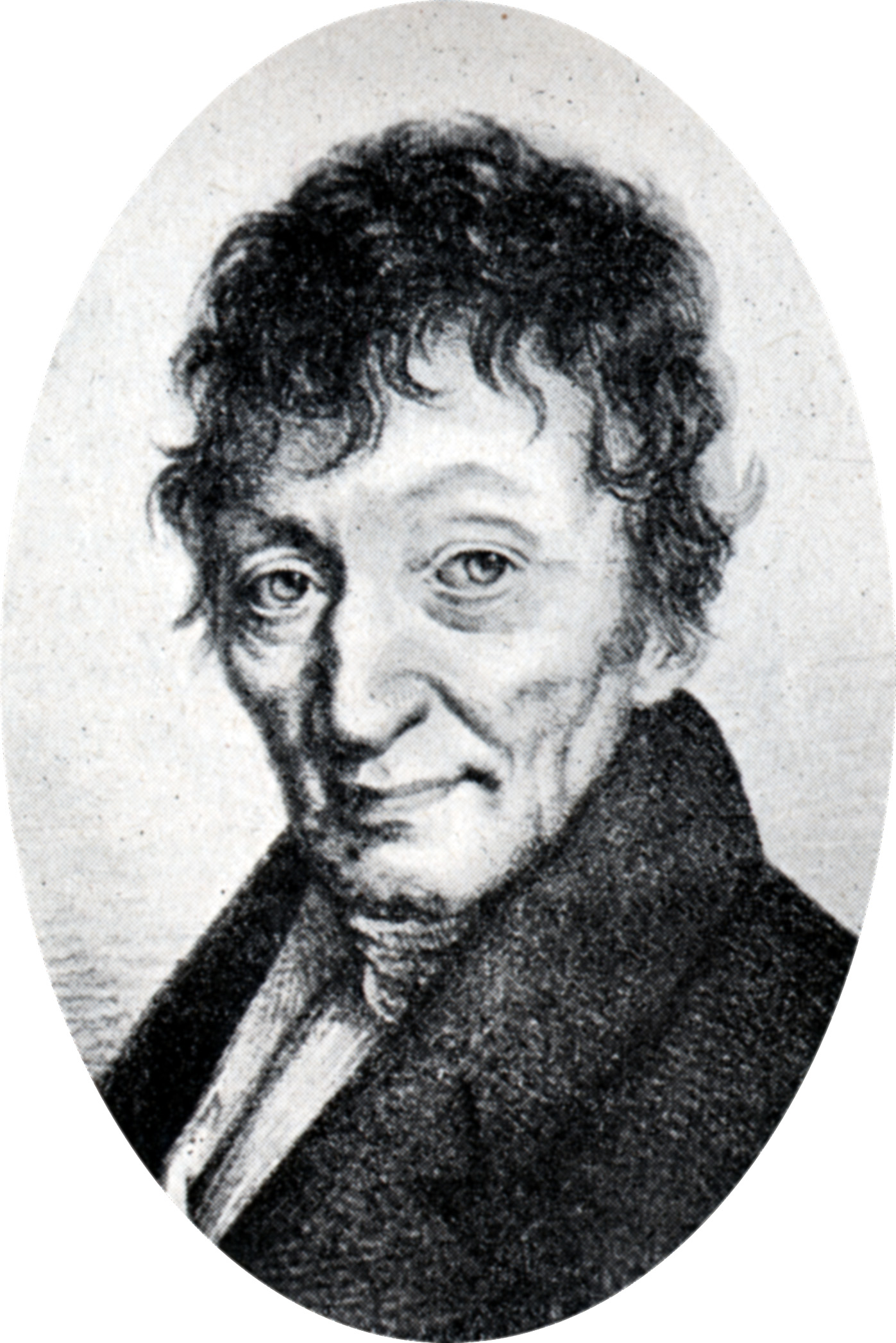
- Born: 5 November 1758; Bournois, Maine-et-Loire, France
- Died: 2 May 1831 (aged 72); Paris
- Known for: Histoire des végétaux recueillis dans les îles de France, de Bourbon et de Madagascar
- Scientific career
- Fields: Botany
- Author abbrev. (botany): Thouars

Louis-Marie Aubert du Petit-Thouars (5 November 1758, Bournois – 12 May 1831, Paris) was a French botanist known for his work collecting and describing orchids from the three islands of Madagascar, Mauritius and Réunion. The standard author abbreviation Thouars is used to indicate this person as the author when citing a botanical name.

== Introduction ==
Petit-Thouars came from an aristocratic family of the region of Anjou, where he grew up in the castle of Boumois, near Saumur. In 1792, after an imprisonment of two years during the French Revolution, he was exiled to Madagascar and the nearby islands such as La Réunion (then called Bourbon). He started collecting many plant specimens on Madagascar, Mauritius and La Réunion.

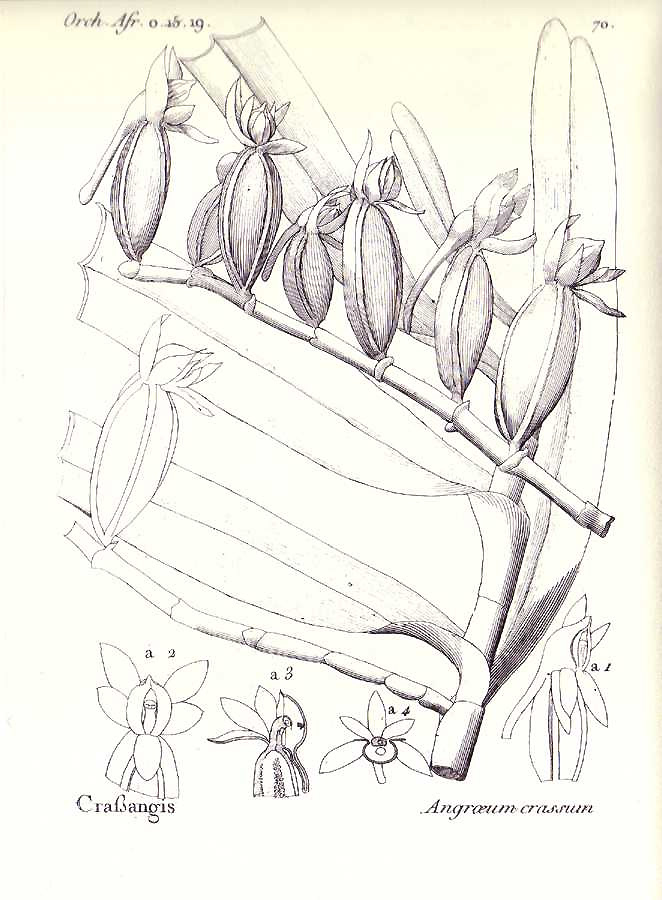
Angraecum crassum, a drawing of this orchid by Thouars in his book Orch. Il. Afr.

Ten years later he was able to return to France with a collection of about 2000 plants. Most of his collection went to the Muséum de Paris, while some species ended up at Kew. He was elected member of the prestigious Académie des Sciences on 10 April 1820.

Du Petit-Thouars is remembered as the author of the book Histoire des végétaux recueillis dans les îles de France, de Bourbon et de Madagascar (usually abbreviated in botanic literature as Hist. vég. îles France), illustrated by many beautiful drawings. Other books followed: Mélanges de botanique et de voyages and Histoire particulière des plantes orchidées recueillies dans les trois îles australes de France, de Bourbon et de Madagascar (l'île de France is the present island of Mauritius and l'île de Bourbon is the present La Réunion). He did pioneering botanical work by his descriptions of orchids from this region: 52 species from Mauritius and 55 from La Réunion.

== Orchid genera named by Thouars ==
- Angorchis Thouars 1809.(now : Angraecum Bory, 1804).
- Bulbophyllum Thouars 1822, describing 17 species.
- Centrosis Thouars, 1822. (now : Calanthe R.Br., 1821).)
- Corymborkis Thouars 1809 (now : Corymborchis Thou. ex Blume 1855)
- Cynorkis Thouars 1809
- Dendrorkis Thouars, 1809 (now : Polystachya Hook., 1824)
- Gastrorchis Thouars 1809
- Graphorkis Thouars 1809 (now Phaius Lour)
- Hederorkis Thouars 1809
- Leptorkis Thouars ex Kuntze, 1891 (now : Liparis Rich.,1817).
- Phyllorkis Thouars 1822 (now : Bulbophyllum Thouars, 1822).

== Orchid species (of other genera) named by him ==
- Cryptopus elatus Lindl. 1824, originally described as Angraecum elatum by Thouars (collected from the island Mauritius)
- Mystacidium gracile [Thouars] Finet 1907

== Plants named in his honor ==
- Actinoschoenus thouarsii (Kunth) Benth. (family Cyperaceae)
- Alafia thouarsii Roem. & Schult.(1819) (family Apocynaceae)
- Arthrostylis thouarsii Kunth (family Cyperaceae)
- Bambusa thouarsii Kunth (family Poaceae)
- Cirrhopetalum thouarsii Lindl. (1830). (type orchid of the genus)
- Corymborchis thouarsii Blume = Corymbis corymbosa
- Cycas thouarsii R.Br (1810), a Madagascan cycad (family: Cycadaceae)
- Dilobeia thouarsii Roem. & Schult. (1818) (family Pteridaceae)
- Drypetes thouarsii (family Euphorbiaceae)
- Fimbristylis thouarsii (Kunth) Merr. (family Cyperaceae)
- Jasminocereus thouarsii (F.A.C.Weber) Backeb. (family Cactaceae)
- Lindernia thouarsii, (family Scrophulariaceae)
- Moyinga thouarsii (common name : Elephant leg tree)
- Protorhus thouarsii Engl (1881) (family Anacardiaceae)
- Strychnopsis thouarsii Baill. (family Menispermaceae)
- Torenia thouarsii (Cham. & Schltdl.) Kuntze (family Scrophulariaceae)
- Typhonodorum lindleyanum thouarsii (family Araceae)
- Uapaca thouarsii (family Euphorbiaceae)
- Voacanga thouarsii Roem. & Schult. (1819) (family Apocynaceae)
- Vonitra thouarsii (family Arecaceae)

== Other species named after him ==
- Eucidaris thouarsii Valenciennes (common name : Slate Pencil Urchin) (Echinodermata)
- Flabellum thouarsii (a group of scleractinian corals from Antarctica)

== Family ==
- Brother:
  - Aristide Aubert du Petit-Thouars (1760–1798) was a French Navy officer, a hero of the Battle of the Nile.
- Their nephew:
  - Abel Ferdinand Aubert du Petit-Thouars (1769-1829), aide-de-camp to General Vignolle, later deputy prefect of Saint-Malo
- Their grandnephew and Abel Ferdinand Aubert's son:
  - Abel Aubert du Petit-Thouars (1793–1864), was a French Navy admiral and botanist, took possession of Tahiti for France.
- Their great-grandnephew and Abel Ferdinand's grandson (by his daughter Sidonie):
  - Abel-Nicolas Bergasse du Petit-Thouars (1832–1890), a French Navy admiral who participated to the Boshin War in Japan.
    - note that Abel-Nicolas Bergasse was Abel Aubert's nephew, but also became his adopted son
