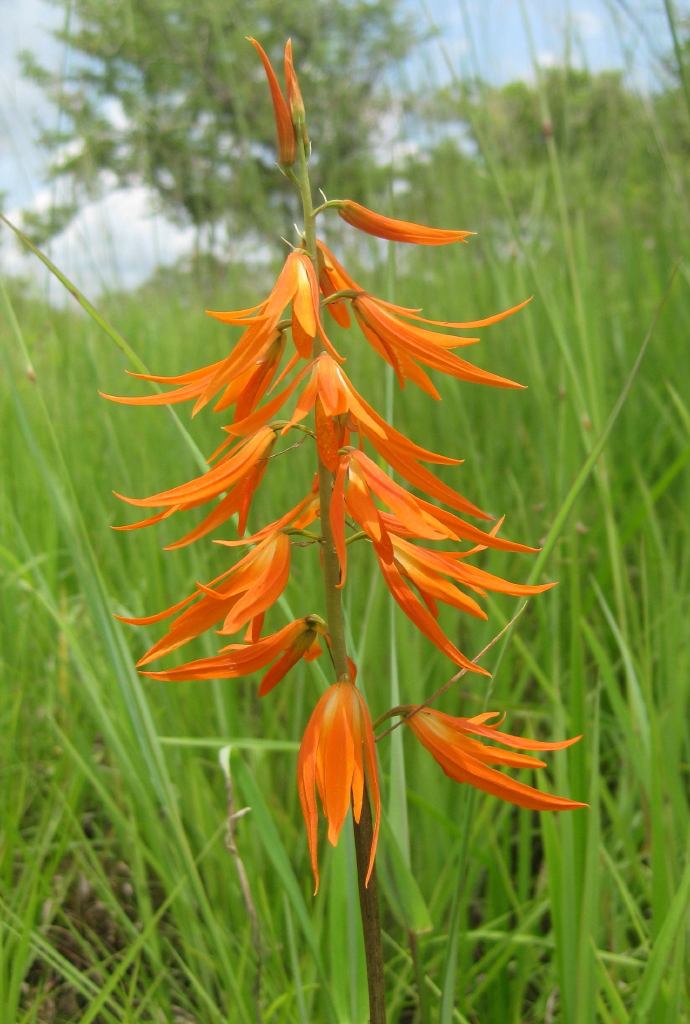
- Orthochilus walleri

Scientific classification
- Kingdom: Plantae
- Clade: Tracheophytes
- Clade: Angiosperms
- Clade: Monocots
- Order: Asparagales
- Family: Orchidaceae
- Subfamily: Epidendroideae
- Tribe: Cymbidieae
- Subtribe: Eulophiinae
- Genus: Orthochilus; Hochst. ex A.Rich.

Species
- See text

Synonyms
- Pteroglossaspis Rchb.f.; Triorchos Small & Nash; Smallia Nieuwl.

= Orthochilus =

Genus of orchids

Orthochilus is a genus of orchids that consists of at least 34 species, most of which are native to Africa and Madagascar with a few species in tropical and subtropical America. The genus was first formally described in 1850 by the French botanist Achille Richard, who cited an earlier suggestion by the German botanist Christian Ferdinand Friedrich Hochstetter. Richard recognized a single species, Orthochilus abyssinicus, and noted that the genus shared many features with the closely related genus Eulophia, but differed from it in the form of the pollen masses and caudicule, a stalk to which the pollen masses are attached. The genus Orthochilus has often been viewed as a synonym of the larger genus Eulophia by many botanists, but a recent molecular phylogeny published in 2014 revealed that Eulophia, as traditionally circumscribed, was paraphyletic unless Orthochilus was recognized as a separate genus.

As circumscribed by Martos et al., the genus Orthochilus includes many species formerly recognized as belonging to the large genus Eulophia and the smaller genus Pteroglossaspis. The species in Orthochilus can be readily identified as different from Eulophia in that their petals and sepals are similar in appearance (shape, size, and color) and the flowers are roughly bell-shaped (campanulate), whereas most Eulophia have sepals and petals that differ in appearance. Further study of other species currently assigned to Eulophia may increase the total number of species recognized within the Orthochilus clade.

== Species ==
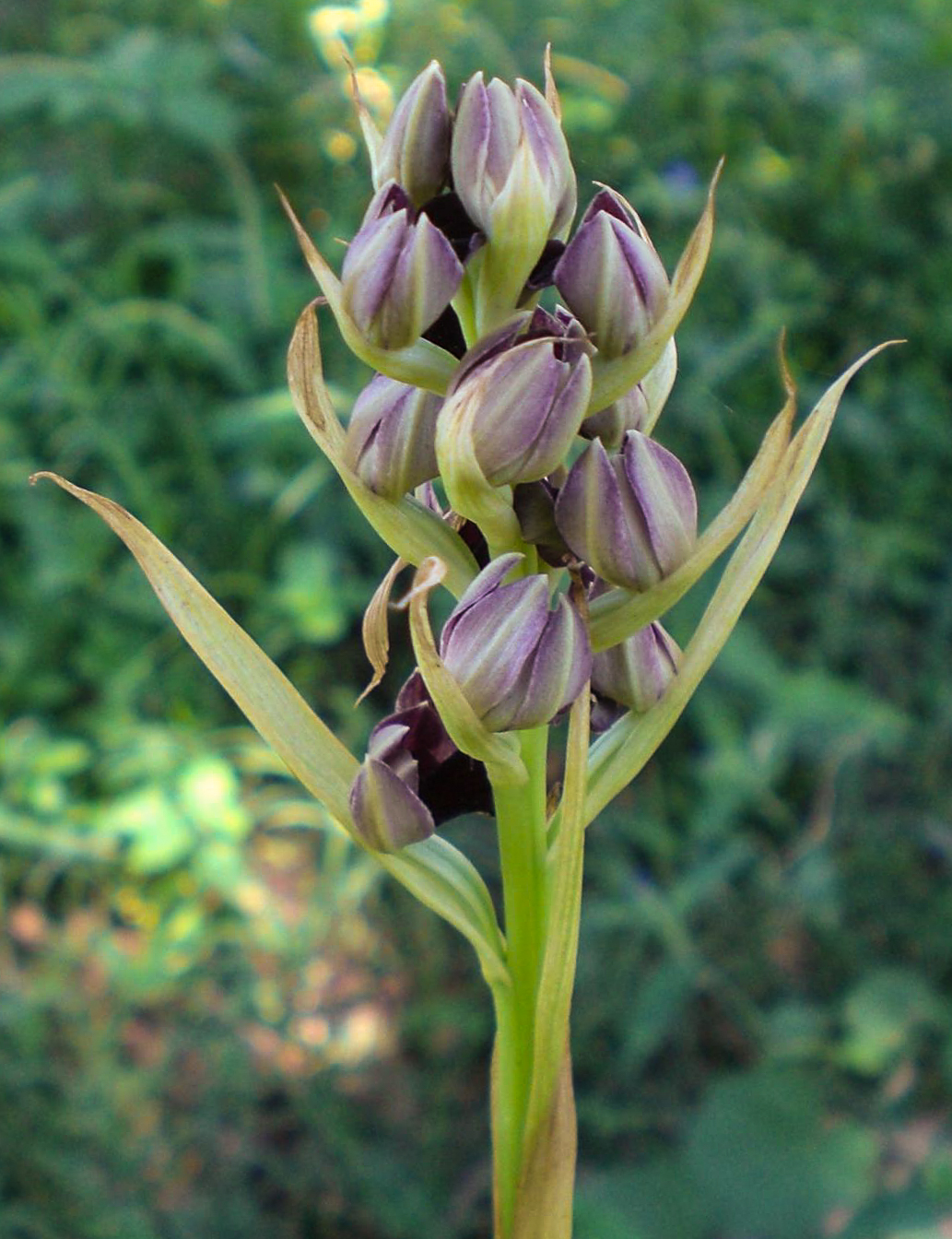
Orthochilus ruwenzoriensis

- Orthochilus abyssinicus (Rchb.f.) Hochst. ex A.Rich.
- Orthochilus aculeatus (L.f.) Bytebier
  - Orthochilus aculeatus subsp. huttonii (Rolfe) Bytebier
- Orthochilus adenoglossus (Lindl.) Bytebier
- Orthochilus albobrunneus (Kraenzl.) Bytebier
- Orthochilus aurantiacus (Rolfe) Bytebier
- Orthochilus carsonii (Rolfe) Bytebier
- Orthochilus chloranthus (Schltr.) Bytebier
- Orthochilus clandestinus (Börge Pett.) Bytebier
- Orthochilus corymbosus (G.Will.) Bytebier
- Orthochilus distans (Summerh.) Bytebier
- Orthochilus ecristatus (Fernald) Bytebier
- Orthochilus ensatus (Lindl.) Bytebier
- Orthochilus euanthus (Schltr.) Bytebier
- Orthochilus eustachyus (Rchb.f.) Bytebier
- Orthochilus foliosus (Lindl.) Bytebier
- Orthochilus holubii (Rolfe) Bytebier
- Orthochilus leontoglossus (Rchb.f.) Bytebier
- Orthochilus litoralis (Schltr.) Bytebier
- Orthochilus mechowii Rchb.f
- Orthochilus milnei (Rchb.f.) Bytebier
- Orthochilus montis-elgonis (Summerh.) Bytebier
- Orthochilus nuttii (Rolfe) Bytebier
- Orthochilus odontoglossus (Rchb.f.) Bytebier
- Orthochilus pottsii (P.M.Br. & DeAngelis) Bytebier
- Orthochilus rarus (Schltr.) Bytebier
- Orthochilus rutenbergianus (Kraenzl.) Bytebier
- Orthochilus ruwenzoriensis (Rendle) Bytebier
- Orthochilus subulatus (Rendle) Bytebier
- Orthochilus tabularis (L.f.) Bytebier
- Orthochilus thomsonii (Rolfe) Bytebier
- Orthochilus trilamellatus (De Wild.) Bytebier
- Orthochilus vinosus (McMurtry & G.McDonald) Bytebier
- Orthochilus walleri (Rchb.f.) Bytebier
- Orthochilus welwitschii Rchb.f.
