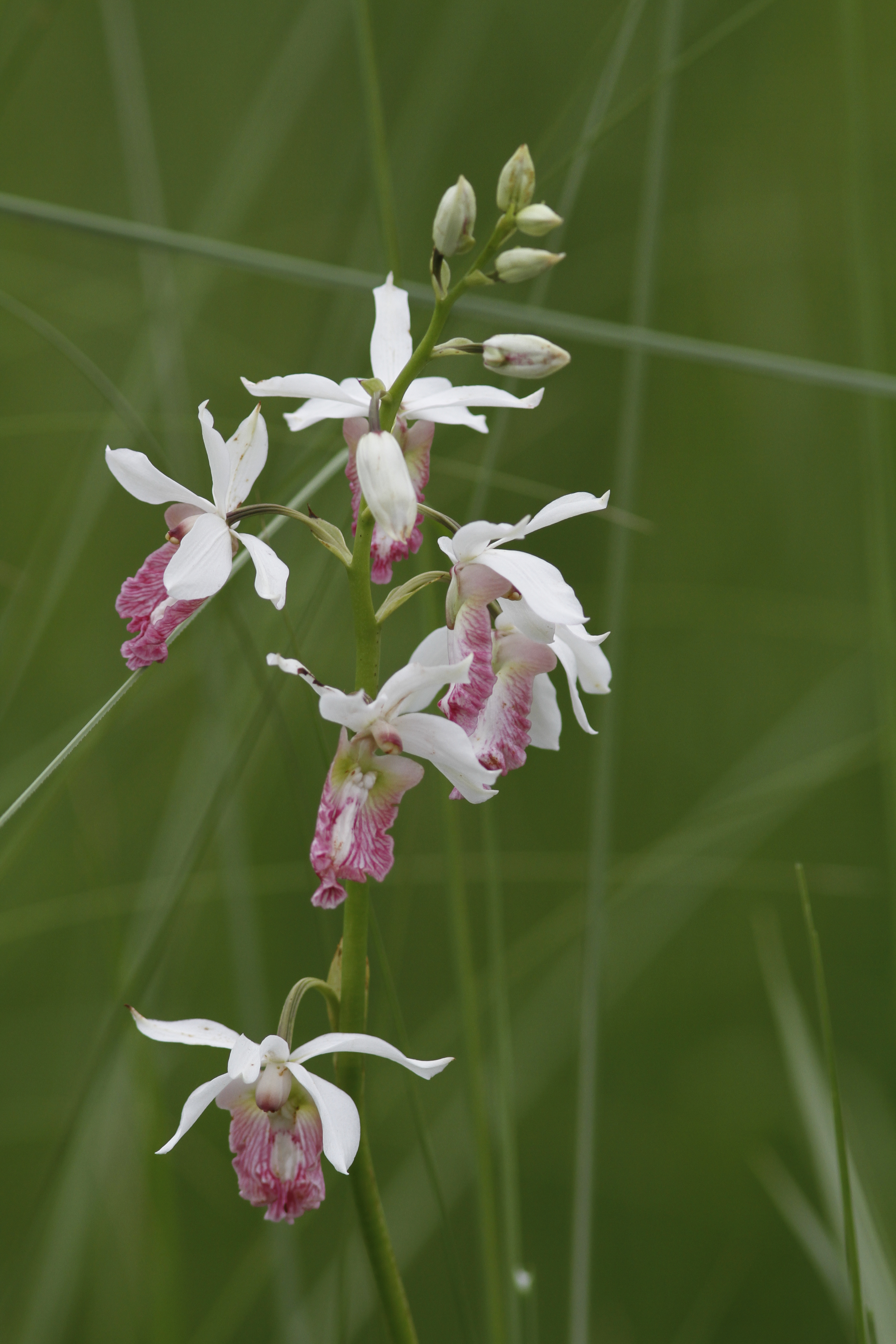
- With bloomed flower in Bangladesh

Scientific classification
- Kingdom: Plantae
- Clade: Tracheophytes
- Clade: Angiosperms
- Clade: Monocots
- Order: Asparagales
- Family: Orchidaceae
- Subfamily: Epidendroideae
- Genus: Eulophia
- Species: E. obtusa

Binomial name
- Eulophia obtusa (Lindl.) Hook.f.

Synonyms
- Cyrtopera obtusa Lindl.; Eulophia campanulata Duthie; Graphorkis obtusa (Lindl.) Kuntze; Lissochilus obtusus (Lindl.) Schltr.

= Eulophia obtusa =

Species of orchid

Eulophia obtusa, a showy and distinctive species of orchid, popularly known as the ground orchid, recorded from Bangladesh, North India and Nepal (Sourav, M.S.H, et al. 2017). This orchid growing in seasonally in grassland. It is a grass associated orchid species. A Bangladesh based renowned botanist and ornithologist Md Sharif Hossain Sourav first described this rare species from Bangladesh in 2017 (Sourav, M.S.H, et al. 2017). There are only three collections in the Kew Herbarium dates from 1902, which suggests that it is quite a rare species. It is assessed as critically endangered (CR) in Bangladesh according to the 2023 edition of IUCN Red Listing criteria. Very recently this species was rediscovered in India after 118 years.

== Description ==
Terrestrial, seasonally deciduous herb, bearing underground corms. Corm white, dome-shaped, 2.5 – 3.1 cm wide and 3.3 – 5.5 cm high, lying 10 – 20 cm below ground, bearing vermiform, white roots. Shoots 1 – 5-leaved, usually bifoliate, the basal part formed by sheaths enveloping the base of the inflorescence as well as the leaf-bases. Leaves appearing with the inflorescence, grass-like, 35 – 50 cm long, 0.15 – 0.5 cm wide, linear, slightly plicate, apex acuminate, midrib prominent, sheathing at base. Column 8 mm long, with a short foot.

In the wild, no fruiting has been observed in Eulophia obtusa, and no viable seeds have been collected from natural populations. Recent conservation assessments suggest that manual pollination experiments may be necessary to obtain fertile seeds for propagation and potential reintroduction efforts. This highlights a critical gap in understanding the species' reproductive biology.

Due to the absence of fruit production, the identity of its natural pollinators remains unknown. Further research is needed to investigate which insects might serve as pollinators, potentially through field observation or pollinator exclusion and trapping studies.

Insights from related species such as Eulophia alta may be useful for comparative purposes. E. alta has been observed to exhibit partial self-pollination and is visited by large bees, including species of various sweat bees (Halictidae) and Apis. Commonly known as honeybees. They are among the most important pollinators in both natural and agricultural ecosystems. Several species, including Apis mellifera (the western honeybee) and Apis cerana (the eastern honeybee), are frequently observed visiting orchid flowers in various habitats. This suggests that large-bodied pollinators could also be important for E. obtusa, provided that such insects are present in its native habitat.

Martos et al. (2014) conducted a molecular phylogenetic study indicating that the genus Eulophia is paraphyletic unless the genus Orthochilus is reinstated as a separate lineage. The family Orchidaceae exhibits extensive variation in chromosome numbers, ranging from 2n = 10 to 240, with n = 19 or 20 being common in many species. However, to date, there are no published reports on the chromosome count of Eulophia obtusa.

The only known site of Eulophia obtusa in Bangladesh is situated in the high Barind tract, one of the major agro-ecological regions comprising about 79% of Godagari upazila. The vegetation is composed of grasses like Imperata cylindrica and Saccharum spontaneum as well as herbs and shrubs, including Amorphophallus margaritifer, Amorphophallus paeoniifolius, Boerhavia diffusa, Chrozophora rottleri, Colocasia esculenta, Commelina benghalensis, Croton bonplandianus, Cyanotis cristata, Cyperus sp., Digera muricata, Euphorbia hirta, Ficus hispida, Kyllinga microcephala, Leucas lavandulifolia, Lippia alba, Parthenium hysterophorus, Phyllanthus virgatus, Solanum villosum, Uraria picta, and others. In North India, Eulophia obtusa has been found in freshwater swamps (Deva & Naithani 1986). The elevations have not been recorded for the collections we have seen, but they are probably all from below 200 m above sea level.

Flowering: June – July; fruiting: not seen, but local informants stated that they had seen the plants in fruit.
