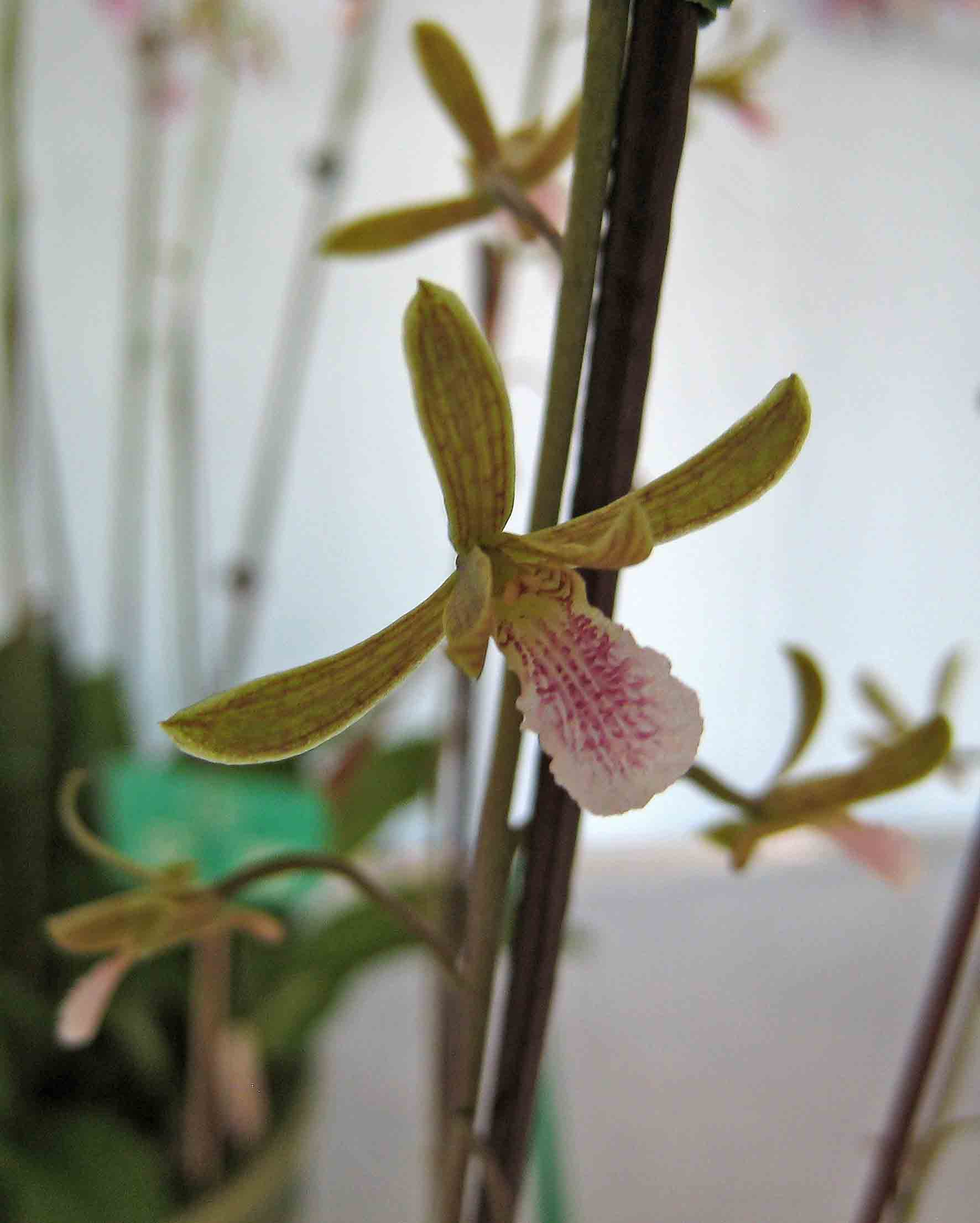

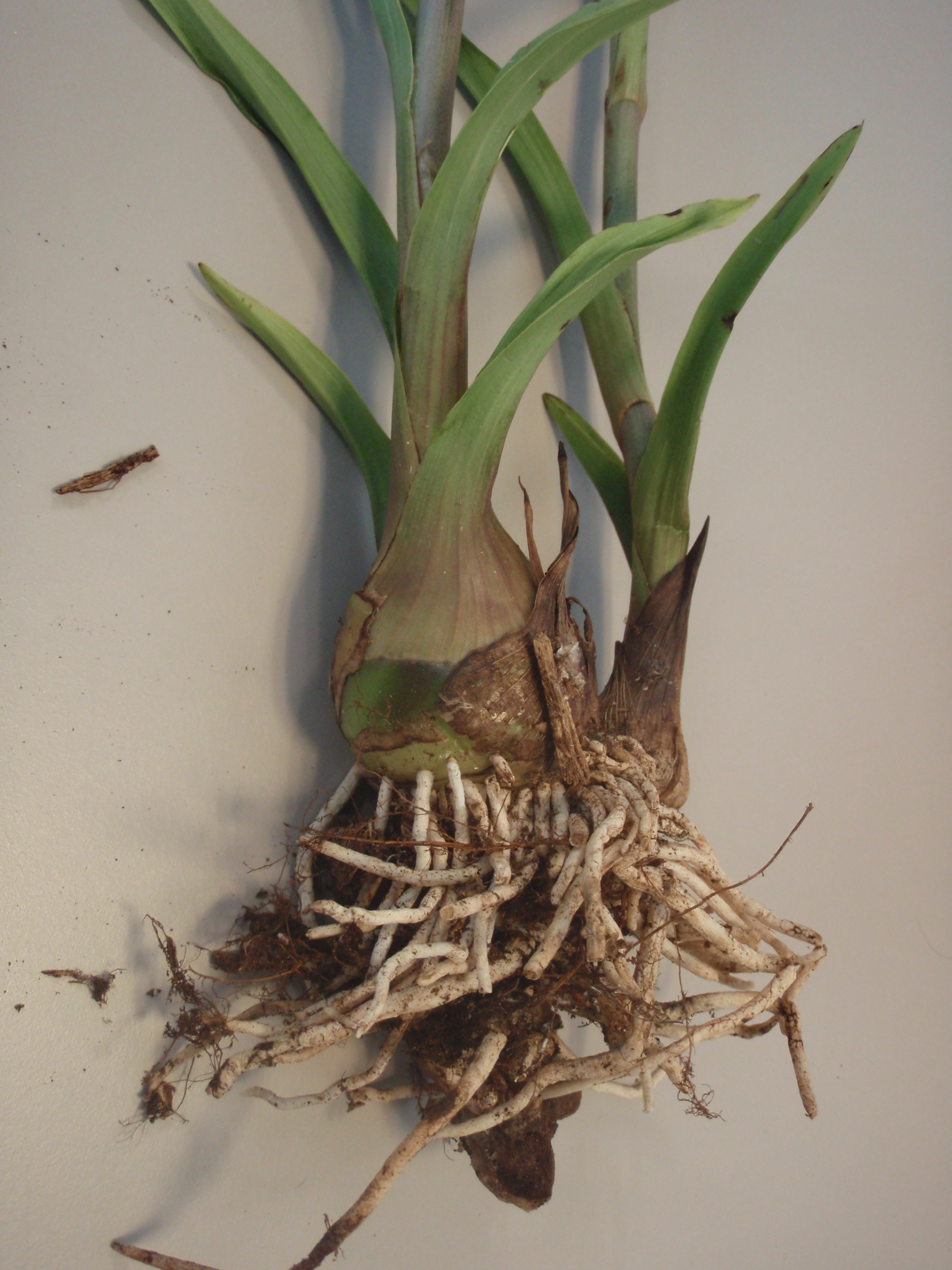

Scientific classification
- Kingdom: Plantae
- Clade: Tracheophytes
- Clade: Angiosperms
- Clade: Monocots
- Order: Asparagales
- Family: Orchidaceae
- Subfamily: Epidendroideae
- Genus: Eulophia
- Species: E. graminea

Binomial name
- Eulophia graminea Lindl. 1833

Synonyms
- Eulophia decipiens; Eulophia gusukumae, also spelled Eulophia gusukumai; Eulophia inconspicua; Eulophia ramosa; Eulophia sinensis; Eulophia ucbii; Eulophia venusta; Graphorkis decipiens; Graphorkis graminea; Graphorkis inconspicua

= Eulophia graminea =

Species of orchid

Eulophia graminea, the Chinese crown orchid or the grass-leaved orchid, is a species of orchid native to Asia, but now naturalized in several other areas. A defining characteristic is its grass-like leaves; this is also the origin of its species epithet.

== Distribution ==
It is native to tropical and subtropical regions of Asia, such as the Andaman Islands, Assam, Bangladesh, Bhutan, Borneo, Cambodia, China (Anhui, Fujian, Guangdong, Guangxi, Guizhou, Hainan, and Yunnan), the Eastern Himalayas, India, Laos, Myanmar, Nepal, the Nicobar Islands, Pakistan, the Philippines, the Ryukyu Islands (Nansei-shoto), Sri Lanka, Sumatra, Taiwan, Thailand, Vietnam, and the Western Himalayas. In Singapore, it behaves as a common weed of uncertain origin and grows among places including roadsides, sandy beaches, lawns, secondary forests, parks, and wasteland.

Regarding its conservation status, it is listed as a vulnerable species by the Okinawa Red List. Reportedly, the species is also considered threatened in Sri Lanka.

=== As an invasive species ===
Considering its efficiency when it comes to colonization, the orchid has spread to a variety of other areas outside of Asia and naturalized, with examples including Texas, Australia, Florida, South Africa, Puerto Rico, and the West Indies; in these areas, some also consider it an invasive species. In regions where Eulophia graminea is considered invasive, it typically forms dense monocultures.

There is a chance that climate change may influence the spread of Eulophia graminea and cause its habitable range to expand drastically; research implies that by the year 2100, Eulophia graminea will expand its range in the US by 36% to 193% depending on climate change intensity.

== Description ==
Eulophia graminea grows from a pseudobulb and produces a flower stalk that typically reaches 39 to 79 cm (15 to 31 in) in height, however it is capable of growing up to 5 ft (150 cm; 60 in) tall. In Odisha, the orchid was seen producing keikis at the apex of its leaves, reported as a novel trait previously unseen in orchids. Its chloroplast genome is 149,481 bp in length.

=== Pseudobulbs ===
The pseudobulb, sometimes misleadingly referred to as a bulb, possesses up to five narrow, grass-like leaves and roots on their underside, and are one of the first things the seedling develops shortly after germination. It stores nutrients, allowing the orchid to persist and undergo vegetative reproduction. The leaves range from 1 to 15 in (2.5 to 38.1 cm) long. Sometimes, the pseudobulbs can grow partially exposed above the soil surface.

Analysis of specimens from Fuzhou, Fujian showed that the pseudobulbs contain approximately 11.75% polysaccharides, 9.14 milligrams per gram (mg/g) of sterols, 2 mg/g of triterpenoids, and 0.018 milligrams per milliliter (mg/mL) of flavonoids, suggesting they could potentially be used for medicinal purposes.

Reportedly, extracts from the pseudobulb of Eulophia graminea have been used as ear drops for treating ear problems; other Eulophia species have also been used for unrelated medicinal purposes, all being grouped (along with Dioscorea bulbifera) under the name amarkand (अमरकंद, a combination of amar [अमर, immortal/undying] and kand [कंद, bulb/tuber]) in India.

As the pseudobulbs grow and expand, they can begin to lift structures on top of them; in one study, a pseudobulb was observed lifting a concrete stepping stone approximately 5 cm (2.0 in) above the mulch.

=== Inflorescence ===
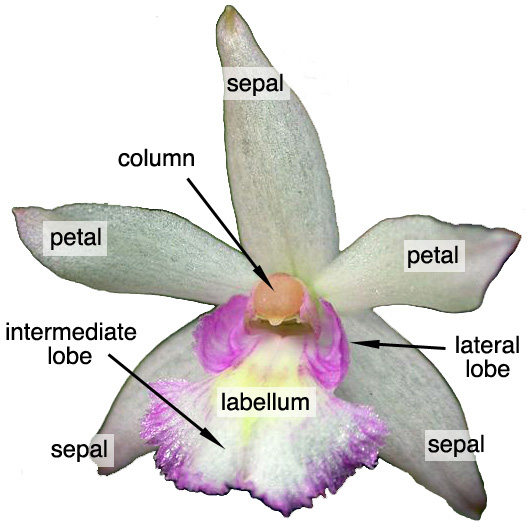
Orchid flower terminology (Leptotes)

The flower stalk may bear flowers for at least one month, and each individual flower is open for an average of 11 days (1.6 weeks). It typically blooms from October to January, and can have up to 60 flowers per flower stalk. The flowers mature sequentially along the flower stalk with the youngest flower buds being at the top.

Both the sepals and petals have dark purple veins running through them. The flowers have a small but noticeable nectar spur containing approximately 0.5 μl (3.1×10^{−5} cu in) of nectar, and the petals are 9.6 to 10.9 mm (0.38 to 0.43 in) by 2.6 to 3.3 mm (0.10 to 0.13 in). The dorsal sepal is 10.5 to 14.3 mm (0.41 to 0.56 in) by 2 to 3 mm (0.079 to 0.118 in) and the lateral sepals are 11.2 to 15.5 mm (0.44 to 0.61 in) by 2.2 to 2.8 mm (0.087 to 0.110 in). When flattened down to its full size, the tongue-like pink labellum of the flower is 10.4 to 13.5 mm (0.41 to 0.53 in) by 7 to 8.4 mm (0.28 to 0.33 in).

=== Fruit ===
The fruit is a dry, greenish-brown capsule that is 1.6 to 3.1 cm (0.63 to 1.22 in) long (excluding remnants of the pedicel and perianth) with a diameter of 0.7 to 1.2 cm (0.28 to 0.47 in). The production of fruit is reportedly low, which is an unusual trait for species offering a pollinator reward.

When hand-pollinating this orchid, a 100% success rate (in this sense, 10 out of 10) in fruit development was shown when outcrossing the flowers (pollination between two distinct specimens), compared to a 40% success rate (in this sense, 4 out of 10) when using the flowers' own pollen.

The fruit dehisces once it is ripe and the seeds inside are ready to exit; observations showed that some flower stalks had fruits dehiscing while open flowers were still present.

=== Seeds ===
The seeds have a length of 74.5 μm (0.0745 mm; 0.00293 in), making them comparable to dust. The seeds are airborne and wind-dispersed, allowing the orchid to spread quickly into new areas. There is a broad range of mycorrhizal fungi the seeds can associate with; 10 out of the 18 fungal strains that Eulophia graminea seeds were tested on successfully initiated germination.

== Taxonomy ==
As a species, it was first formally described and published by botanist John Lindley in 1833. The orchid’s species epithet, graminea (meaning “grassy”), refers to its leaves, which resemble grass.

On November 5, 1891, German botanist Otto Kuntze reclassified Eulophia graminea (and many other Eulophia species) into the genus Graphorkis in the second volume of Revisio Generum Plantarum, creating the synonym Graphorkis graminea (Lindl.) Kuntze in the process of doing so.

== Effect in Florida ==
Eulophia graminea at the Pa-hay-okee Trail in the Everglades National Park

In Florida, it is classified as a Category II invasive species by UF/IFAS due to its rapid spread throughout the state and infiltration of commercial wood chip mulch. The first reports of its presence in Florida were around 2006 to 2007, where it was discovered growing in mulch from Miami-Dade County. It has since spread to various natural areas in Florida, such as pine rocklands, pine flatwoods, rockland hammocks, and cypress strands. It is unknown how exactly it managed to enter Florida, although it is suspected that it was introduced as an ornamental plant.

It is one of several widespread naturalized orchids in Florida, alongside species such as Oeceoclades maculata and Zeuxine strateumatica. Its native range has colder temperatures than Florida, which implies the possibility of it spreading northward.

== Gallery ==
The flower, upon closer inspection

Side view of the flower, showing its prominent spur

The developing flower stalk and prominent pseudobulb of a specimen near Gainesville, Florida

The asparagus-like apex of the flower stalk

The leaves in greater detail; the yellow thread-like structures in the background are from Cassytha filiformis

In cultivation at the Northern Territory Herbarium, in Palmerston

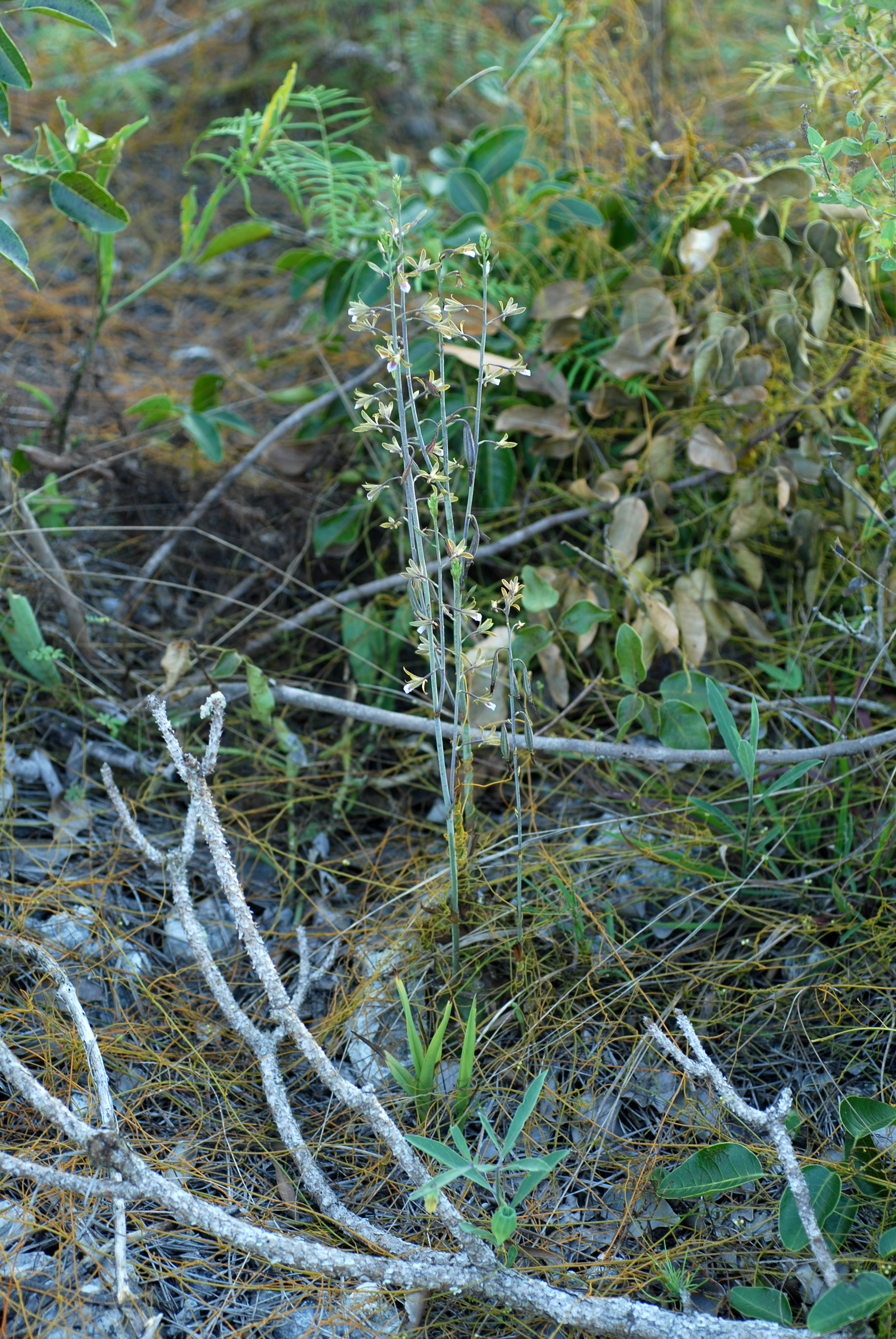
The entire plant, as seen from a short distance

A fruit, in the process of developing
