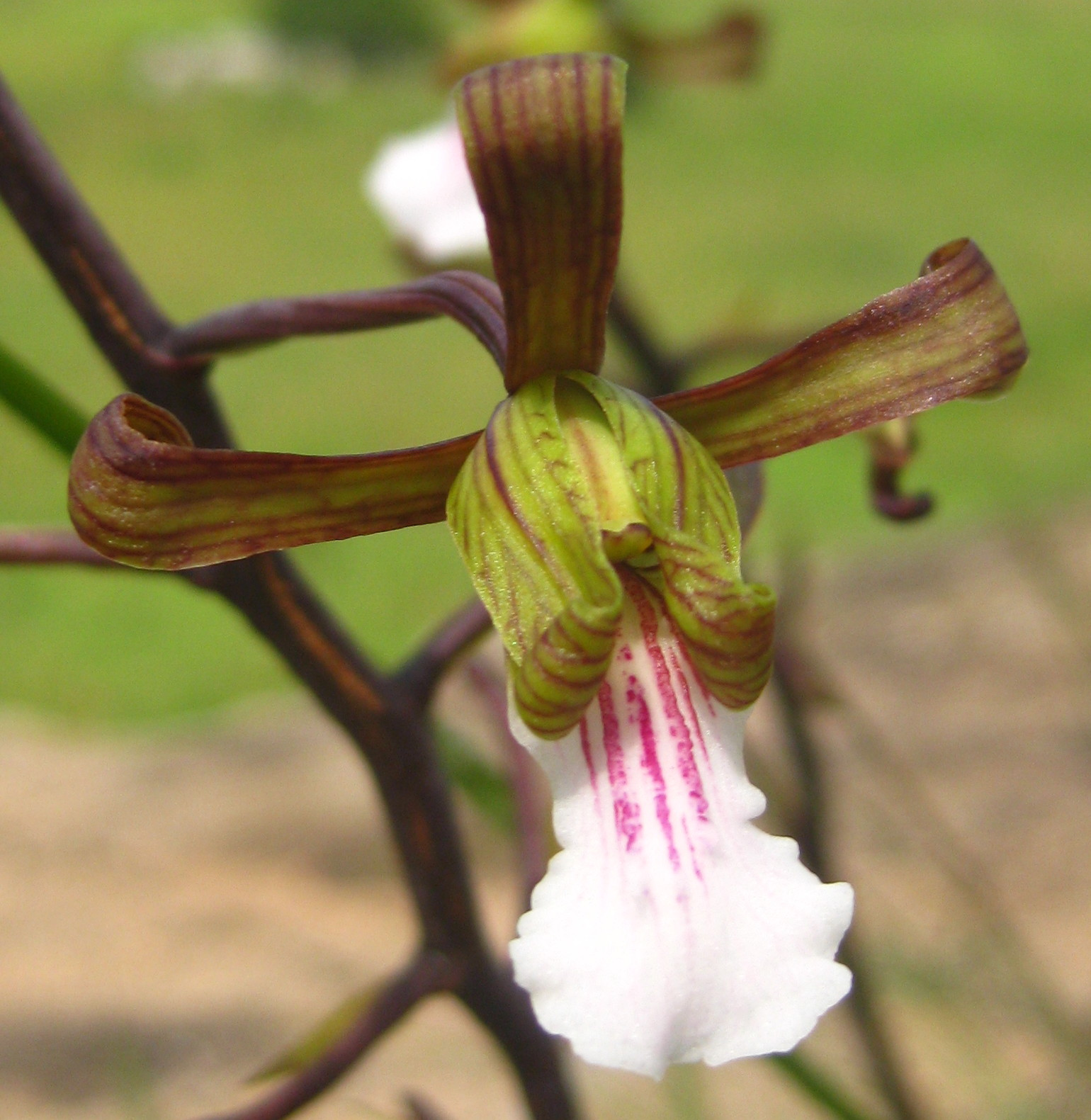

Scientific classification
- Kingdom: Plantae
- Clade: Tracheophytes
- Clade: Angiosperms
- Clade: Monocots
- Order: Asparagales
- Family: Orchidaceae
- Subfamily: Epidendroideae
- Genus: Eulophia
- Species: E. petersii

Binomial name
- Eulophia petersii (Rchb.f.) Rchb.f.

= Eulophia petersii =

Species of orchid

Eulophia petersii is a succulent species of flowering plant in the family Orchidaceae, from southern and eastern Africa.

== Distribution and habitat ==
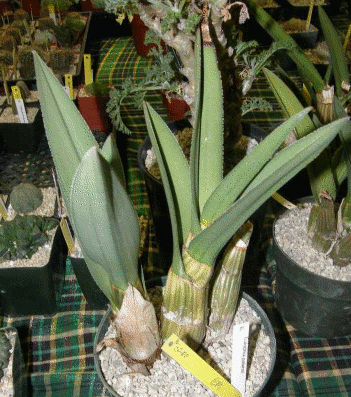
Small plant in cultivation

It is found in arid environments in the Northern Frontier Province, Kenya, the eastern coast of Africa and the former Transvaal region of South Africa.

Eulophia petersii is an unusual member of the orchid family in that it lives in a harsh environment, often in full sun. It is often found growing in acidic sandy soils or in rock outcroppings.

== Description ==
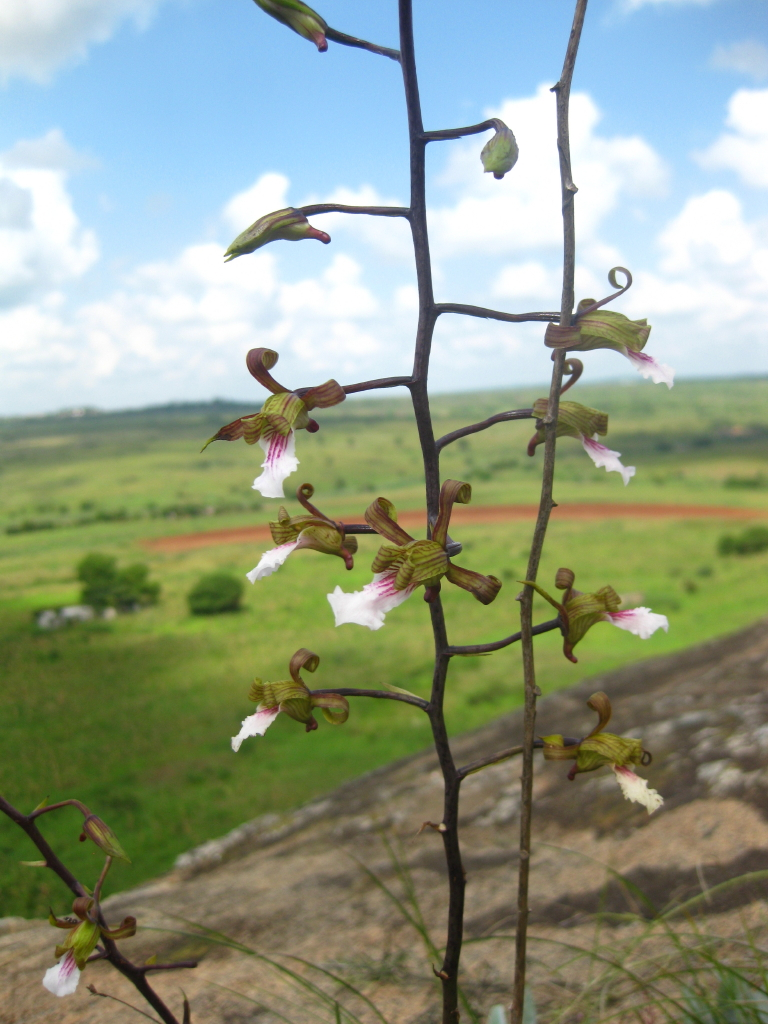
Inflorescence with flowers

The leaves of this orchid are thick, fleshy and very fibrous and have a sharp serrated edge and resemble those of some species of Aloe or some Sansevieria species and are usually 40 cm long. There are usually two to five leaves per pseudobulb. The pseudobulbs are yellow with a pronounced ribbing and 30 cm long with a diameter of 3–4 cm. The form that grows on the southern tip of the Arabian Peninsula (Yemen) is much smaller and more compact in habit.

The flowers are widely spaced on a 2 m inflorescence that can sometimes be branched. The flowers themselves are green with a wrinkled white lip. There is quite a bit of variability in the flowers coloration between plants. Sometimes the sepals and petals can be circinnate.

Eulophia petersii can be crossbred with Grammangis ellisii to form a hybrid named Eulomangis Jumbo Pete.
