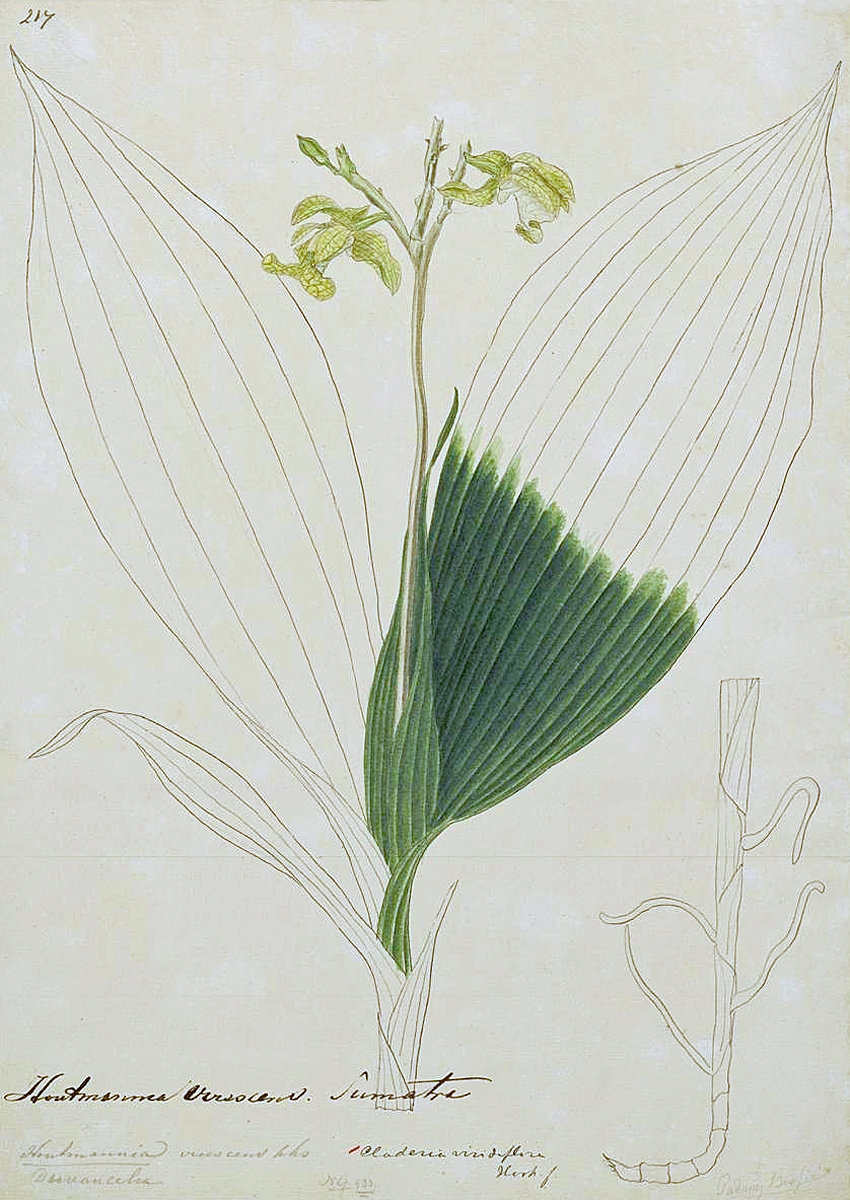
- Claderia viridiflora

Scientific classification
- Kingdom: Plantae
- Clade: Tracheophytes
- Clade: Angiosperms
- Clade: Monocots
- Order: Asparagales
- Family: Orchidaceae
- Subfamily: Epidendroideae
- Tribe: Cymbidieae
- Subtribe: Eulophiinae
- Genus: Claderia; Hook.f.

Type species
- Claderia viridiflora Hook.f.

= Claderia =

Genus of orchids

Claderia is a genus of flowering plants from the orchid family, Orchidaceae. Only two species are known, both epiphytes native to southeast Asia and New Guinea.

- Claderia papuana Schltr. - New Guinea and possibly the Philippines
- Claderia viridiflora Hook.f. - Thailand, Peninsular Malaysia, Borneo, Sumatra, Sulawesi. Reported also from Cambodia, Java and New Guinea but these sitings are unconfirmed.

== See also ==
- List of Orchidaceae genera
