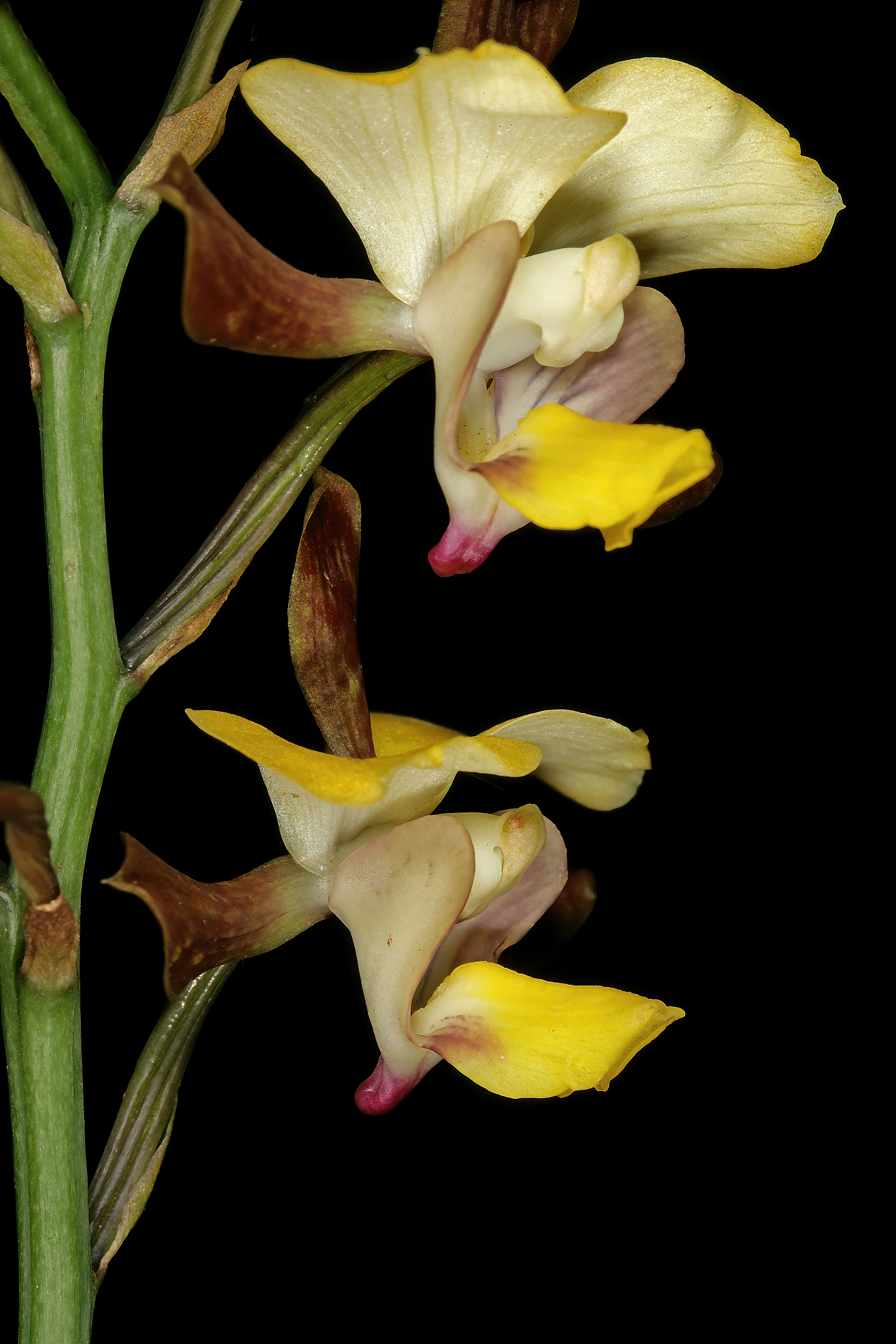

Scientific classification
- Kingdom: Plantae
- Clade: Embryophytes
- Clade: Tracheophytes
- Clade: Spermatophytes
- Clade: Angiosperms
- Clade: Monocots
- Order: Asparagales
- Family: Orchidaceae
- Subfamily: Epidendroideae
- Genus: Eulophia
- Species: E. streptopetala

Binomial name
- Eulophia streptopetala Lindl.

Synonyms
- Lissochilus streptopetalus (Lindl.) Lindl.

= Eulophia streptopetala =

Species of orchid

Eulophia streptopetala is a species of orchid. It can be found from Eritrea to South Africa and also in Yemen. This species is widespread and is usually found at forest margins, in bushy scrub, or in grasslands from the coast to 2550 meters above sea level. The plant produces a tall inflorescence originating from the subterranean pseudobulb that continues to produce flowers over several months. The flowers are approximately one centimetre in diameter with yellow petals and brownish green striped sepals.

== Description ==
Eulophia streptopetala was first described by the botanist John Lindley in 1826. It is a medium to large-sized terrestrial geophyte with ovoid pseudobulbs carrying 4 to 7 elongate-linear to lanceolate, plicate, arching leaves. The plant can reach up to 2.5 metres (8 ft) in height. It produces an erect raceme of up to 90 centimetres (35 in) in length, bearing many flowers with oblong to oblong-lanceolate bracts. The flowers have yellow petals and brownish-green striped sepals, with the lip streaked red-brown. The species is long-blooming, flowering over several months.

=== Varieties ===
Three varieties are currently recognised:

- ”Eulophia streptopetala” var. ”streptopetala”
- ”Eulophia streptopetala” var. ”rueppelii” (Rchb.f.) P. J. Cribb
- ”Eulophia streptopetala” var. ”stenophylla” (Summerh) P.J.Cribb

== Distribution ==
Eulophia streptopetala has a wide native range across sub-Saharan Africa and the southwestern Arabian Peninsula. It has been recorded in the following countries: Angola, Burundi, Eritrea, Ethiopia, Kenya, Malawi, Mozambique, Namibia, Rwanda, Sudan, Tanzania, Uganda, Yemen, Zambia, Zimbabwe, and South Africa.

== Habitat ==
Eulophia streptopetala is a highly adaptable species, occurring across a wide range of habitats from sea level to elevations of 2,550 metres (8,370 ft). It is most commonly found at forest margins, in thickets and bushy scrub, in open woodlands including miombo woodland, and in montane grassland, often growing in long grass of woodland.

The species grows primarily in shady areas under trees. At higher altitudes, it has adapted to non-native timber plantations and is considered one of the few indigenous orchids capable of growing in the acidic soil conditions found under pine trees and in eucalyptus plantations. The variety stenophylla is specifically associated with shaded bushland, open grassland, and rocky hillsides at elevations of 1,400 to 2,100 metres.

The species begins its growth cycle around September and reaches its flowering peak in November, typically flowering between December and February.

== Ethnobotical uses ==
Eulophia streptopetala has documented uses in traditional medicine in southern Africa. The Swazi people of Eswatini (formerly Swaziland) have historically used the plant to prepare remedies for unspecified childhood illnesses. Like all orchid species, E. streptopetala is protected under CITES regulations, which restrict its collection and trade internationally.
