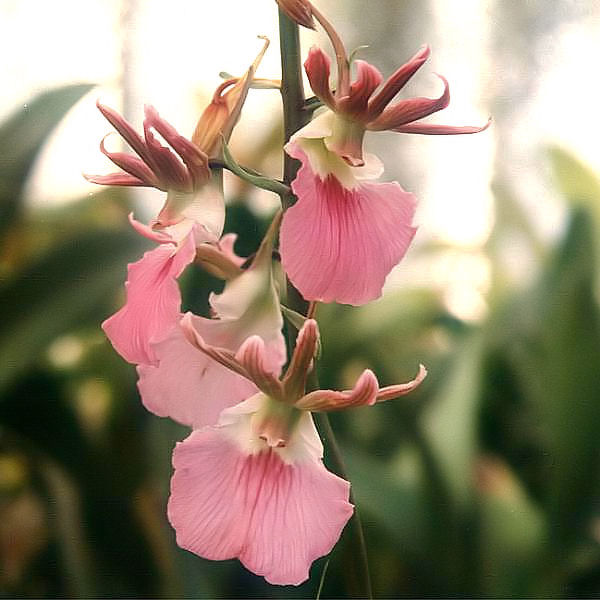
- Eulophia guineensis

Scientific classification
- Kingdom: Plantae
- Clade: Tracheophytes
- Clade: Angiosperms
- Clade: Monocots
- Order: Asparagales
- Family: Orchidaceae
- Subfamily: Epidendroideae
- Tribe: Cymbidieae
- Subtribe: Eulophiinae; Benth.

Genera
- Acrolophia; Ansellia; Claderia; Cymbidiella; Dipodium; Eulophia; Eulophiella; Geodorum; Grammangis; Graphorkis; Imerinaea; Oeceoclades; Orthochilus; Paralophia

= Eulophiinae =

Subtribe of orchids

Eulophiinae is an orchid subtribe in the tribe Cymbidieae. It comprises 270 species divided into nine genera, with the genus Eulophia comprising 60% of these species.

== See also ==
- Taxonomy of the Orchidaceae
