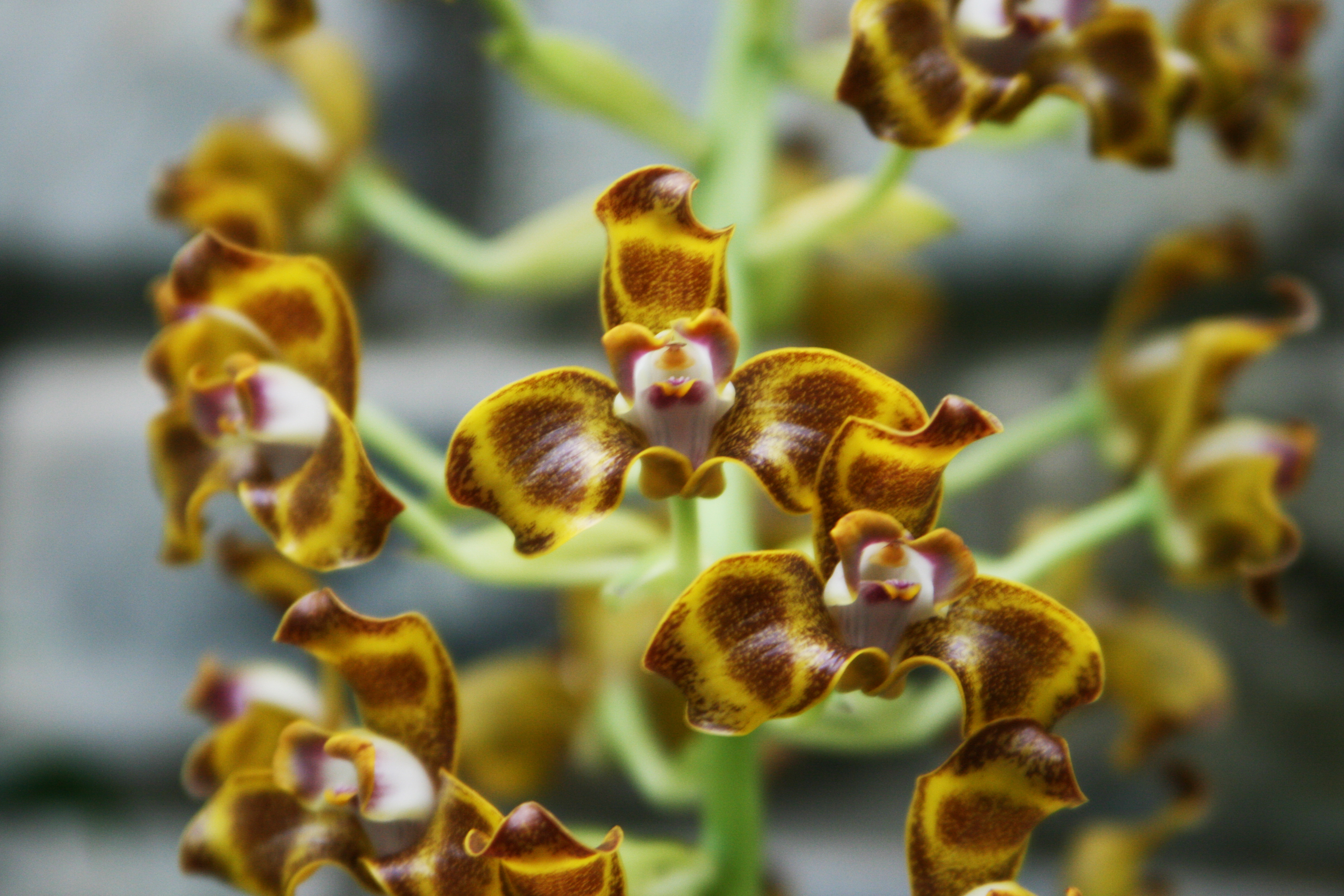
- Grammangis ellisii

Scientific classification
- Kingdom: Plantae
- Clade: Tracheophytes
- Clade: Angiosperms
- Clade: Monocots
- Order: Asparagales
- Family: Orchidaceae
- Subfamily: Epidendroideae
- Tribe: Cymbidieae
- Subtribe: Eulophiinae
- Genus: Grammangis; Rchb.f.

Type species
- Grammangis ellisii Rchb.f.

= Grammangis =

Genus of orchids

Grammangis is a genus of flowering plants from the orchid family, Orchidaceae. It contains only two known species, both endemic to Madagascar.

- Grammangis ellisii (Lindl.) Rchb.f.
- Grammangis spectabilis Bosser & Morat

== See also ==
- List of Orchidaceae genera
