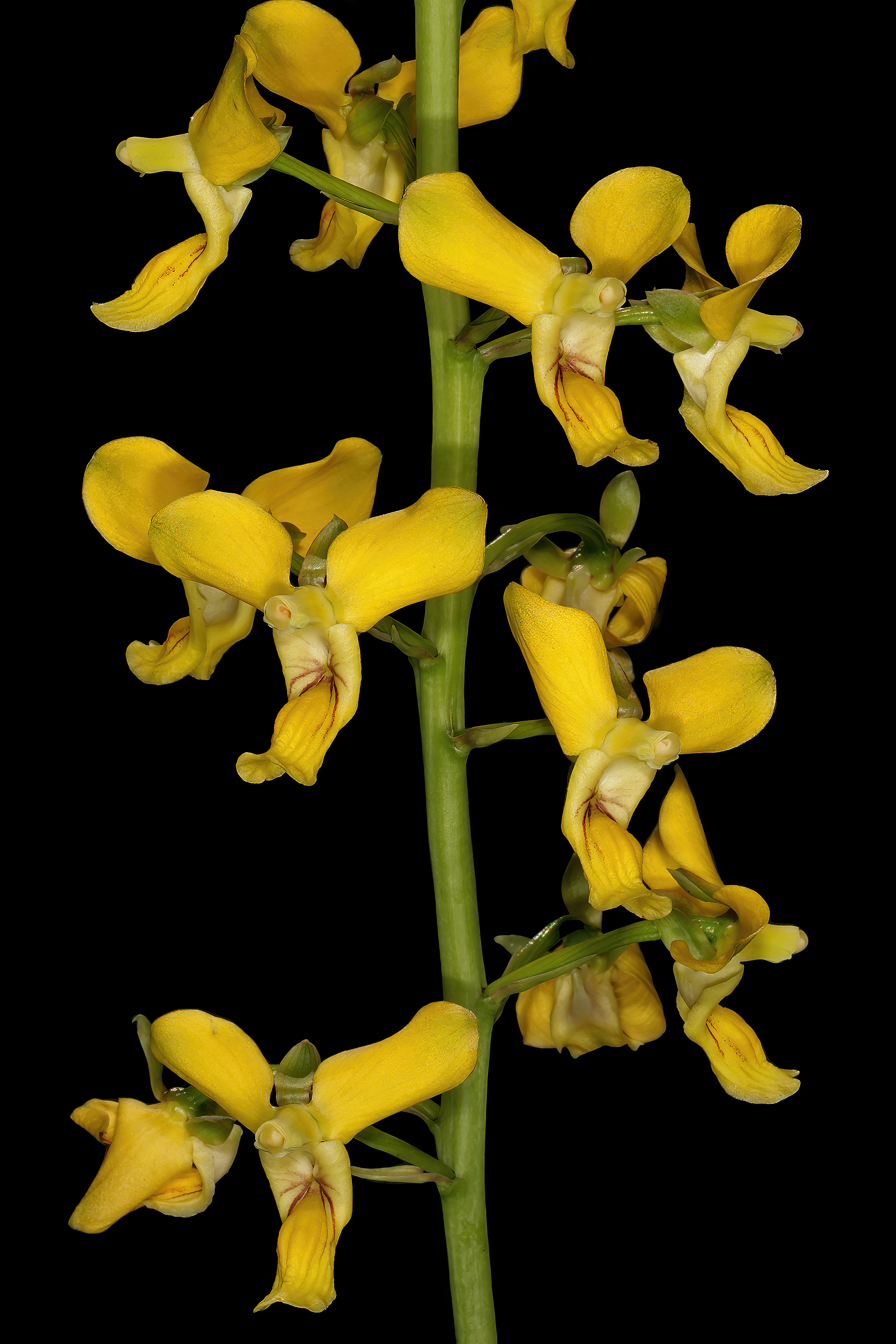

Scientific classification
- Kingdom: Plantae
- Clade: Tracheophytes
- Clade: Angiosperms
- Clade: Monocots
- Order: Asparagales
- Family: Orchidaceae
- Subfamily: Epidendroideae
- Genus: Eulophia
- Species: E. speciosa

Binomial name
- Eulophia speciosa (R.Br. ex Lindl.) Bolus

Synonyms
- See text

= Eulophia speciosa =

Species of orchid

Eulophia speciosa is a species of terrestrial orchid found from Ethiopia to South Africa and in Yemen and Saudi Arabia. The plants usually grow in grasslands in sandy soils or in clay.

== Description ==
The fleshy, lanceolate leaves arise from underground corms/pseudobulbs. The leafless flowering shoot is about 0.4-0.8 m (up to 1.2m) tall, with up to 30 comparatively large flowers in an unbranched raceme. The flowers measure about 25–45 mm in diameter, and are yellow with red markings on the lip of the side lobes.

== Conservation and uses ==
This species is common in most parts of its distribution range in southern Africa, however it does make a good garden plant and is vulnerable to collectors. In South Africa, all orchids are protected by law and the plants must not be removed from the wild without a permit; only nursery-grown plants can be cultivated legally. These plants are used in African tradition as an emetic and as a protective charm against storms.

== Gallery ==
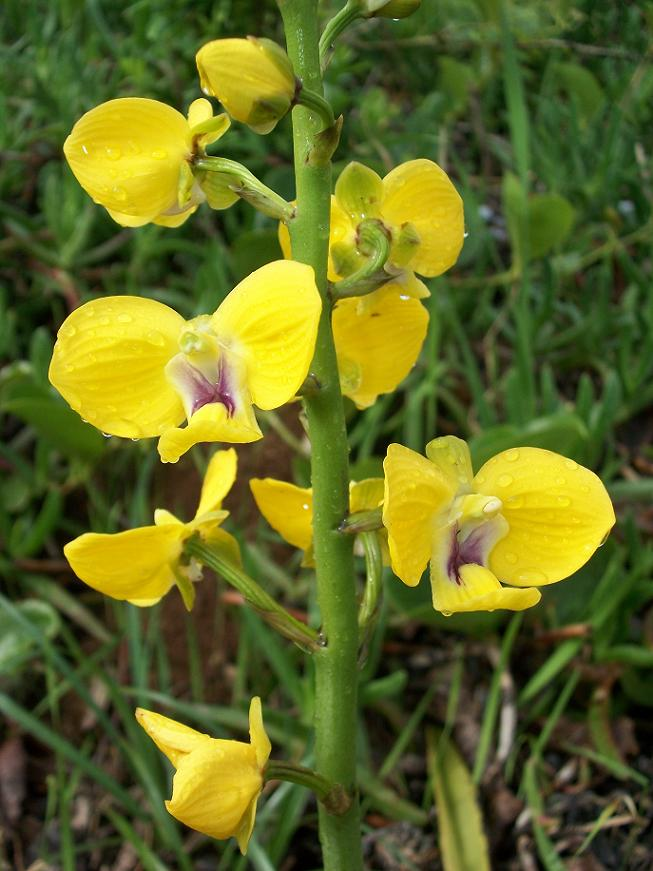
Eulopia speciosa from Amanzimtoti, South Africa

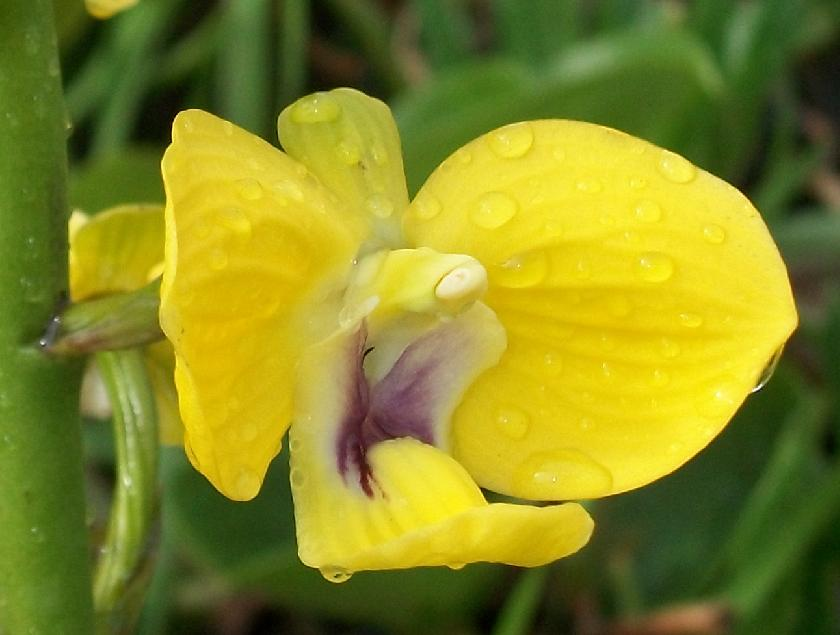
Close-up of a flower

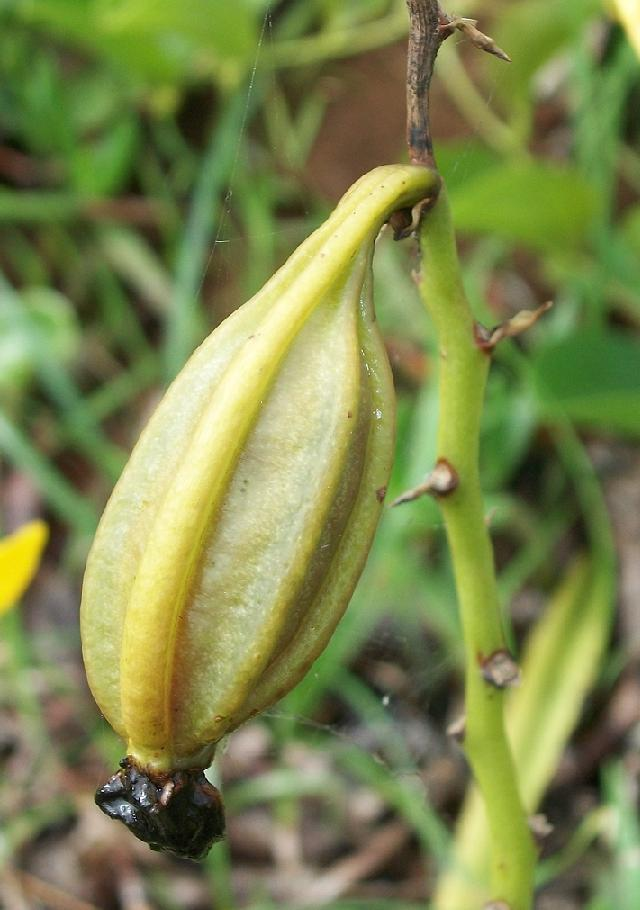
'Fruit' of Eulophia speciosa

== Synonyms ==
Lissochilus speciosus R.Br. ex Lindl. is the basionym. Other synonyms include:

- Cymbidium giganteum (L.f.) Sw.
- Cyrtopera gigantea (L.f.) Lindl.
- Epidendrum giganteum (L.f.) Poir
- Eulophia austrooccidentalis Sölch
- Eulophia brevisepala (Rendle) Summerh.
- Eulophia caloptera (Rchb.f.) Summerh.
- Eulophia coutreziana Geerinck
- Eulophia dispersa N.E.Br.
- Eulophia granitica (Rchb.f.) Cufod.
- Eulophia homblei (De Wild.) Butzin
- Eulophia leucantha (Kraenzl.) Sölch
- Eulophia sapinii De Wild.
- Eulophia speciosa var. culveri Schltr.
- Eulophia volkensii (Rolfe) Butzin
- Eulophia wakefieldii (Rchb.f. & S.Moore) Summerh.
- Limodorum giganteum (L.f.) Thunb.
- Lissochilus brevisepalus Rendle
- Lissochilus calopterus Rchb.f.
- Lissochilus dispersus (N.E.Br.) Rolfe
- Lissochilus graniticus Rchb.f.
- Lissochilus hereroensis Kraenzl.
- Lissochilus homblei De Wild.
- Lissochilus leucanthus Kraenzl.
- Lissochilus rendlei Rolfe
- Lissochilus sapinii De Wild.
- Lissochilus speciosus var. culveri (Schltr.) Rolfe
- Lissochilus volkensii Rolfe
- Lissochilus wakefieldii Rchb.f. & S.Moore
- Satyrium giganteum L.f.
