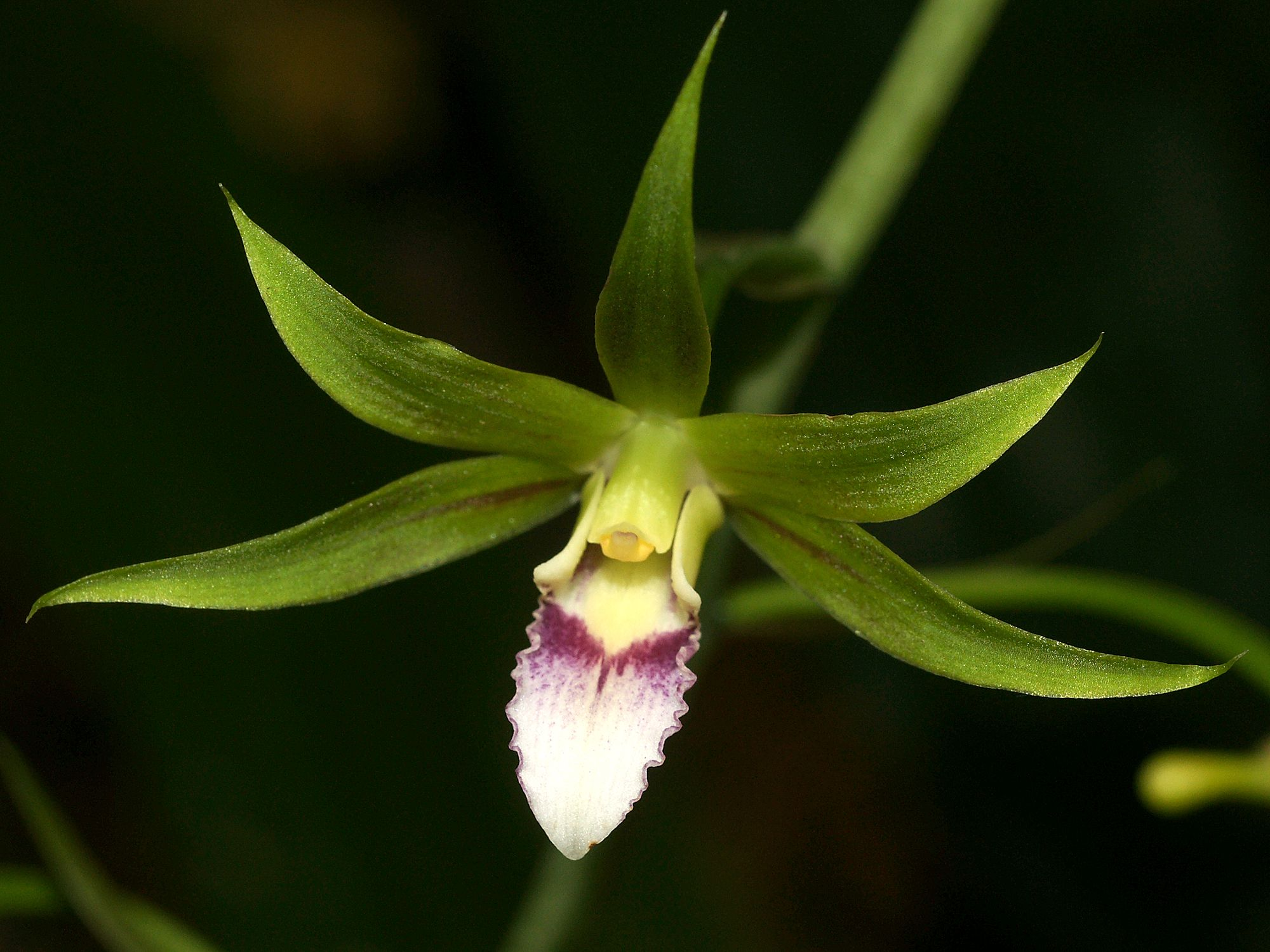

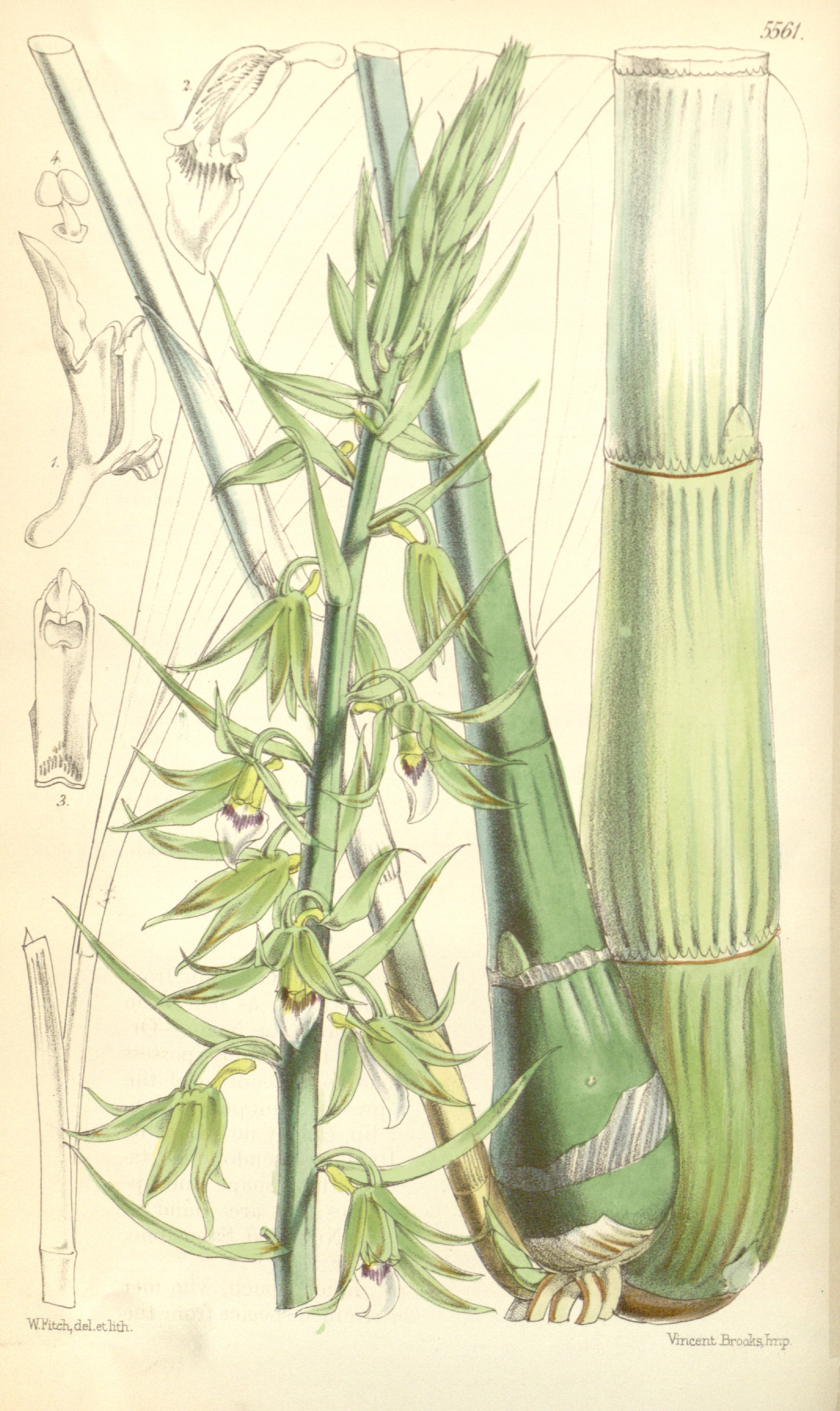

Scientific classification
- Kingdom: Plantae
- Clade: Embryophytes
- Clade: Tracheophytes
- Clade: Angiosperms
- Clade: Monocots
- Order: Asparagales
- Family: Orchidaceae
- Subfamily: Epidendroideae
- Genus: Eulophia
- Species: E. euglossa

Binomial name
- Eulophia euglossa (Rchb.f.) Rchb.f. ex Bateman

Synonyms
- Galeandra euglossa Rchb.f. (Basionym); Eulophia dusenii Kraenzl.

= Eulophia euglossa =

Species of orchid

Eulophia euglossa is a species of orchid native to the western coast of Africa, as well as the nations of Central African Republic and Ethiopia. It is a large sized, cool growing terrestrial found near rivers and has narrow, conical pseudobulbs. Its flowers average a size of 2.5 inches, and its common name, the Euglossa Eulophia, refers to its resemblance to a human tongue.
