= Imerinaea =

Scientific classification
- Kingdom: Plantae
- Clade: Tracheophytes
- Clade: Angiosperms
- Clade: Monocots
- Order: Asparagales
- Family: Orchidaceae
- Subfamily: Epidendroideae
- Tribe: Cymbidieae
- Subtribe: Eulophiinae
- Genus: Imerinaea; Schltr.
- Species: I. madagascarica

Binomial name
- Imerinaea madagascarica Schltr.

- Distribution of Imerinaea Schltr. (Madagascar)

Genus of orchids

Imerinaea is a monotypic genus of flowering plants from the orchid family, Orchidaceae. The single species is Imerinaea madagascarica and is endemic to northern Madagascar. It is lithophilic and grows in shady areas under trees among mosses and lichens.

== See also ==
- List of Orchidaceae genera
