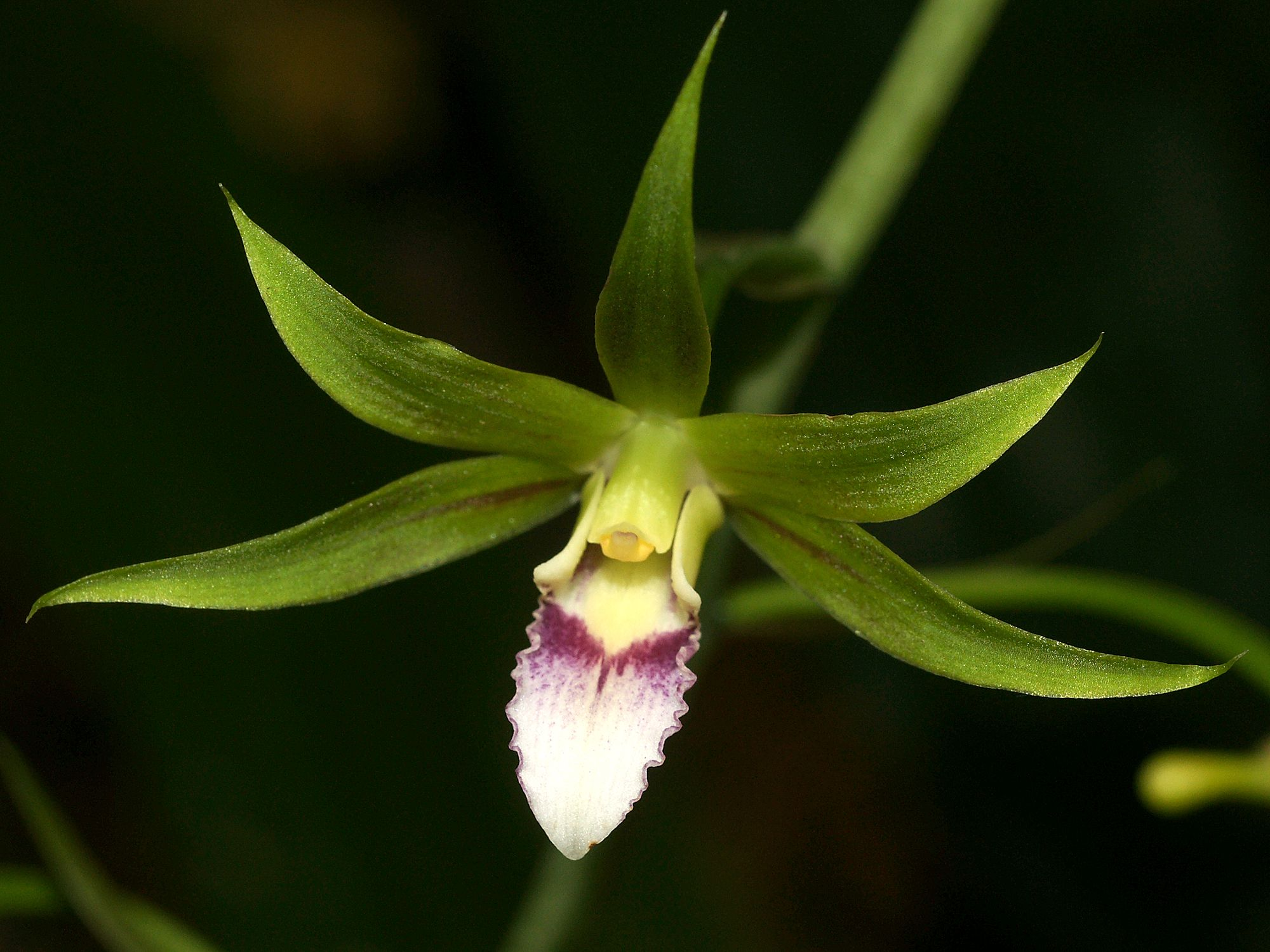
- Eulophia euglossa

Scientific classification
- Kingdom: Plantae
- Clade: Tracheophytes
- Clade: Angiosperms
- Clade: Monocots
- Order: Asparagales
- Family: Orchidaceae
- Subfamily: Epidendroideae
- Tribe: Cymbidieae
- Subtribe: Eulophiinae
- Genus: Eulophia; R. Br. nom. cons.

Species
- See List of Eulophia species

Synonyms
- List: Acrolophia Pfitzer (1887); Caloglossum Schltr. (1918); Cistella Blume (1825); Cymbidiella Rolfe (1918); Cyrtopera Lindl. (1833); Donacopsis Gagnep. (1932); Eulophidium Pfitzer (1887); Eulophiella Rolfe (1891); Eulophus R.Br. (1821), orth. rej.; Geodorum Andrews (1811); Hypodematium A.Rich. nom. illeg.; Lissochilus R.Br.; Oeceoclades Lindl. (1832); Orthochilus Hochst. ex A.Rich.; Ortmannia Opiz (1834); Otandra Salisb. (1812), not validly publ.; Pacisthos Szlach. (2021); Paralophia P.J.Cribb & Hermans (2005); Platypus Small & Nash (1903); Pteroglossaspis Rchb.f. (1878); Semiphajus Gagnep. (1932); Smallia Nieuwl. (1913), nom. superfl.; Thysanochilus Falc. (1839); Triorchos Small & Nash (1903); Vampiraea Szlach. & Cieslicka (2021); Wolfia Dennst. (1818), nom. nud.

= Eulophia =

Genus of orchids

Eulophia, commonly known as corduroy orchids, is a genus of about two hundred species of flowering plants in the orchid family, Orchidaceae. Most Eulophia orchids are terrestrial but some are deciduous while others are evergreen. They either have an underground rhizome or pseudobulbs on the surface and those species with leaves have them on the end of a fleshy stem. The flowers are arranged on a thin flowering spike, the flowers having sepals which are larger than the petals. The genus is widely distributed but most species are found in Africa and Asia, usually growing in shady places with grass or shrubs in forests.

== Description ==
Orchids in the genus Eulophia are mostly terrestrial herbs with either an underground rhizome or pseudobulbs on the surface. The only two epiphytic species occur on Madagascar. Many species have no leaves, but when leaves are present they are long and narrow, sometimes pleated. The flowers are borne on a flowering stem which sometimes appears before the leaves with a few to many flowers. The flowers in some species are small but others have large, showy flowers in a wide range of colours. The sepals are usually larger than the petals but the labellum has three lobes and a spur or pouch at its base.

== Taxonomy and naming ==
The genus Eulophia was first formally described by John Lindley in 1821 and the description was published in The Botanical Register. Because Robert Brown had previously used the name Eulophia in describing Lissochilus speciosus, and the name of that species was changed to Eulophia speciosa, Brown is the accepted author of the name. "Eulophia" is derived from the Ancient Greek words eu meaning "good", "well" or "true" and lophos meaning "mane", "crest", "comb", "tuft" or "ridge", possibly referring to the labellum callus of some species.

== Distribution and habitat ==
Orchids in the genus Eulophia are distributed in shady rainforests or in open scrub or woodland in the tropics and subtropics of Africa, India, Asia, Queensland, and the Americas, although most are found in Africa. Many can survive the dry season through their large bulbous ‘corms’. Some species, such as Eulophia petersii, have adapted to very arid environments and are among the few orchids to have truly evolved desert living species.

== Use in horticulture ==
In the frost-free, semi-arid areas of Southern California, many Eulophia species, such as E. macra, E. petersii, E. plantaginea, and E. speciosa, can be grown outdoors year-round in well-drained pots with cactus/succulent potting mix (although E. speciosa prefers being grown in pure white sand), as long as they are given ample light through the winter and a drier winter resting period. Warmer growers, such as E. pulchra and possibly even the extremely rare and difficult E. cucullata (the foxglove orchid), can probably be grown outdoors in the warmer south areas of Florida and Hawaii, also. The generally large, underground, fleshy rhizome indicates a sympodial growth habit, and this makes Eulophias fairly easy to divide and propagate, provided the grower is gentle.

=== Species ===
See List of Eulophia species

=== Hybrids ===
==== Primary hybrids ====
As of 9 Sept 2021, the following primary hybrids have been registered with the Royal Horticultural Society:

- Eulophia 'Allan Abel' (E. streptopetala x E. guineensis)
- Eulophia 'Douglas McMurtry' (E. ovalis x E. speciosa)
- Eulophia × flavopurpurea (E. cristata x E. millsonii)
- Eulophia 'Jaco Truter' (E. hereroensis x E. streptopetala)
- Eulophia 'Jeannie Wolff' (E. streptopetala x E. speciosa)
- Eulophia 'John Davison' (E. euglossa x E. andamanensis)
- Eulophia 'Memoria Alexis Pardo' (E. guineensis x E. andamanensis)
- Eulophia 'Michael Tibbs' (E. guineensis x E. speciosa)
- Eulophia 'Olive Delight' (E. cooperi x E. hereroensis)
- Eulophia × pholelana (E. ovalis x E. zeyheriana)
- Eulophia 'Shamara' (E. euglossa x E. guineensis)

==== Intergeneric hybrids ====
As off 9 Sept 2021, the following intergeneric hybrids made with Eulophia as the seed/pod (capsule-bearing) parent have been registered with the Royal Horticultural Society:

- Cymbidilophia 'Jumbo Kehong' (E. andamanensis x Cymbidiella pardalina)
- Euclades 'Indianapolis' (E. guineensis x Oeceoclades saundersiana)
- Eulobidium 'Rakthai' (E. andamanensis x Cymbidium aloifolium)
- Eulomangis 'Jumbo Gram' (E. graminea x Grammangis spectabilis)
- Eulomangis 'Jumbo Keith' (E. andamanensis x Grammangis spectabilis)
- Eulomangis 'Jumbo Pete' (E. petersii x Grammangis ellisii)
- Eulophyllum 'Jumbo Keith' (E. andamanensis x Grammatophyllum measuresianum)
- Eulosellia 'Jumbo Nilotica' (E. graminea x Ansellia africana)
- Graphophia 'SAJVOL Germinator' (E. petersii x Graphorkis concolor)

A further three intergeneric hybrids have been registered with Eulophia as the pollen parent:

- Euclades 'Saint Léger' (Oeceoclades cordylinophylla x E. guineensis)
- Eulophyllum 'Jumbo Amos' (Grammatophyllum scriptum x E. andamanensis)
- Gramcymbiphia 'Jumbo Lovely' (Grammatocymbidium 'Lovely Melody' x E. guineensis)

=== Gallery ===
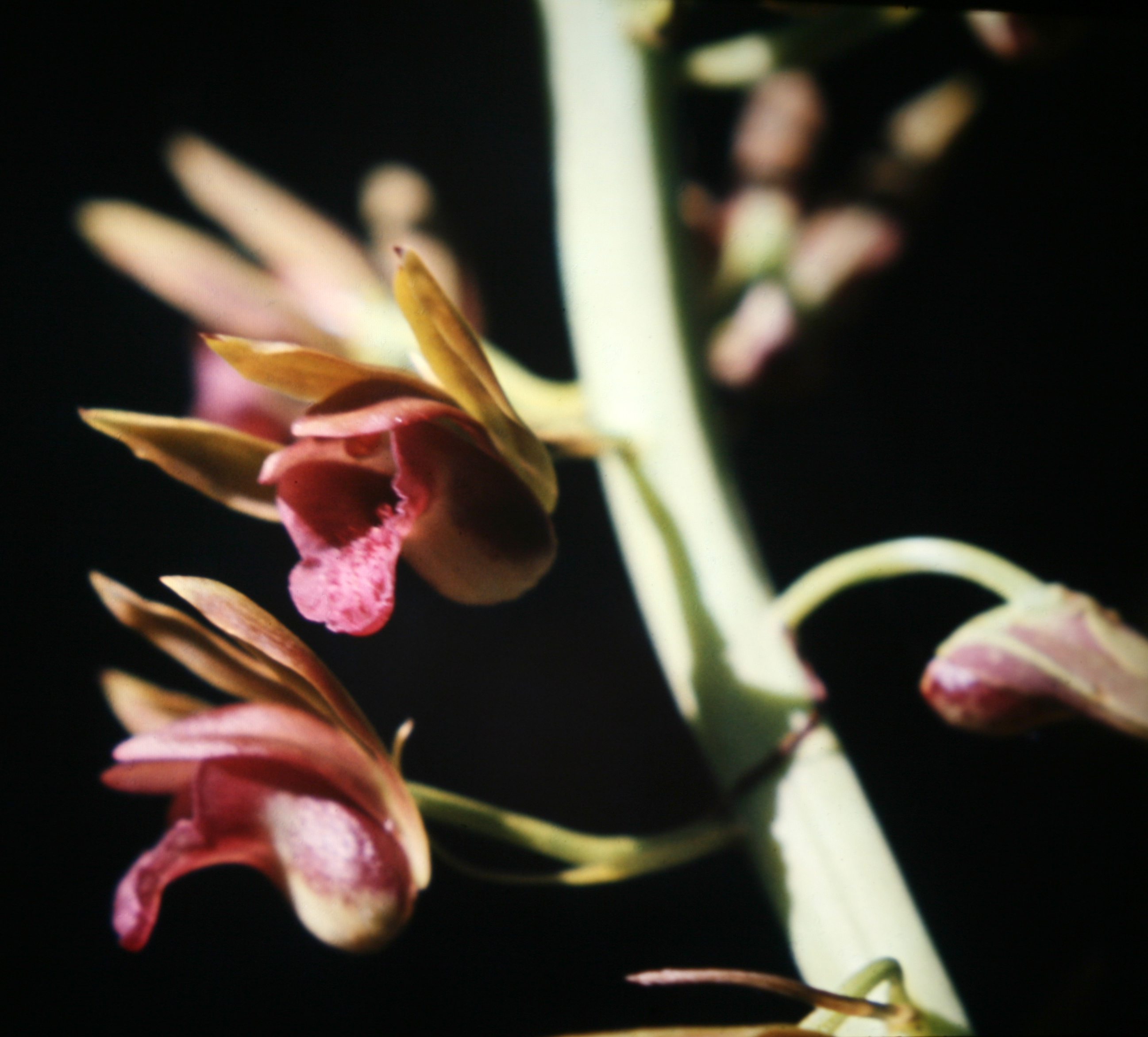
Eulophia alta

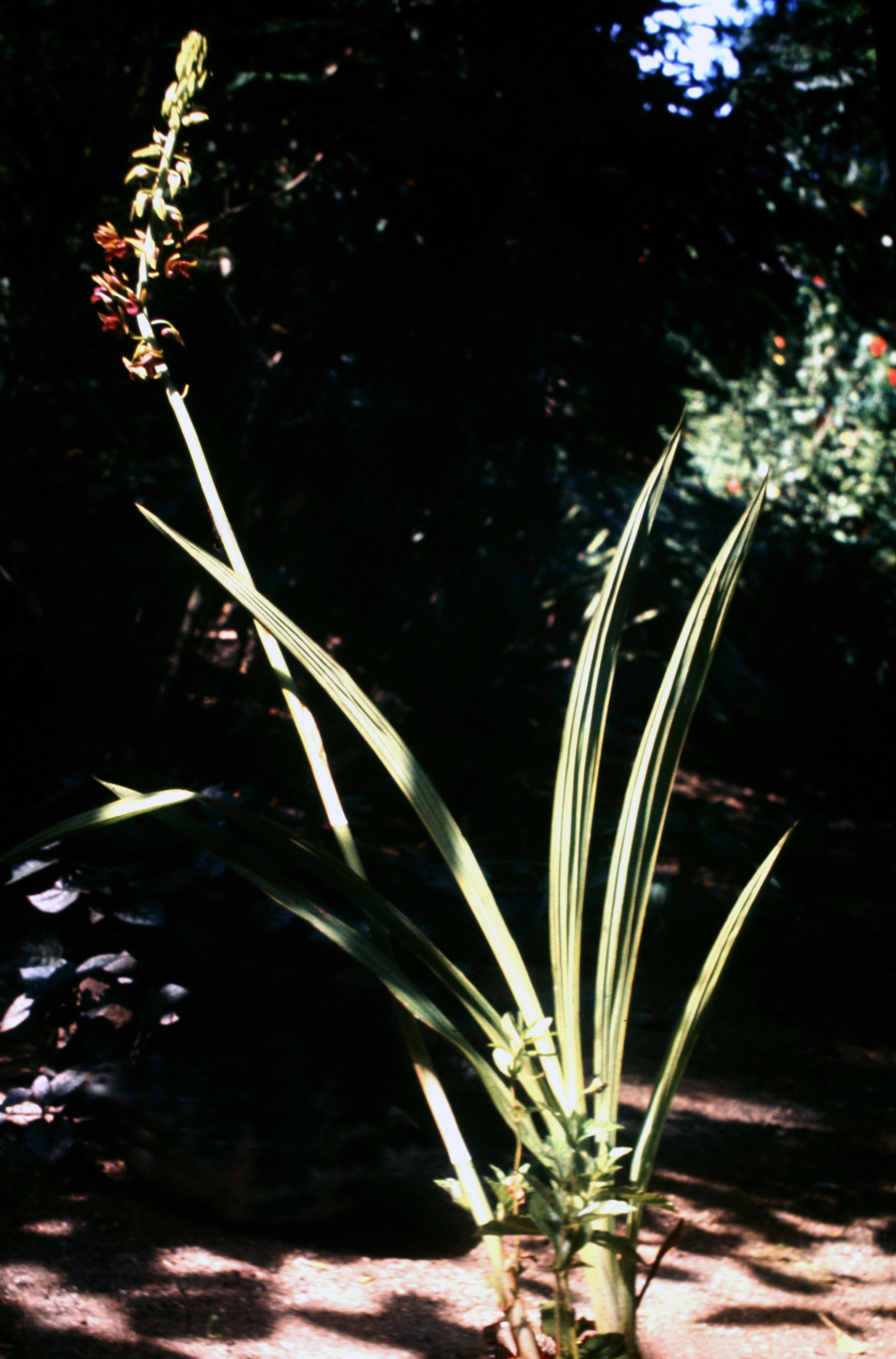
Eulophia alta

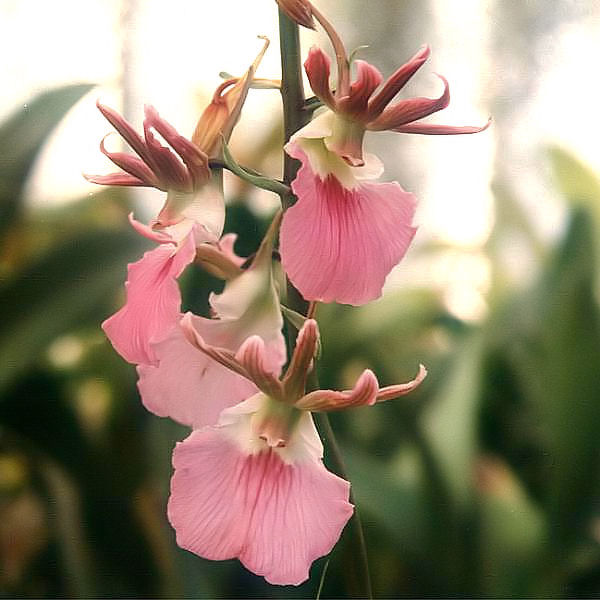
Eulophia guineensis

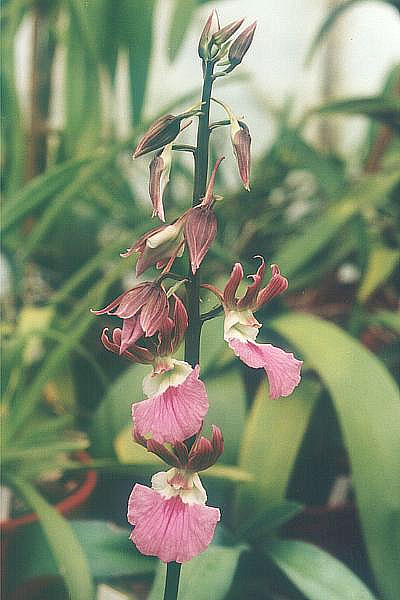
Eulophia guineensis

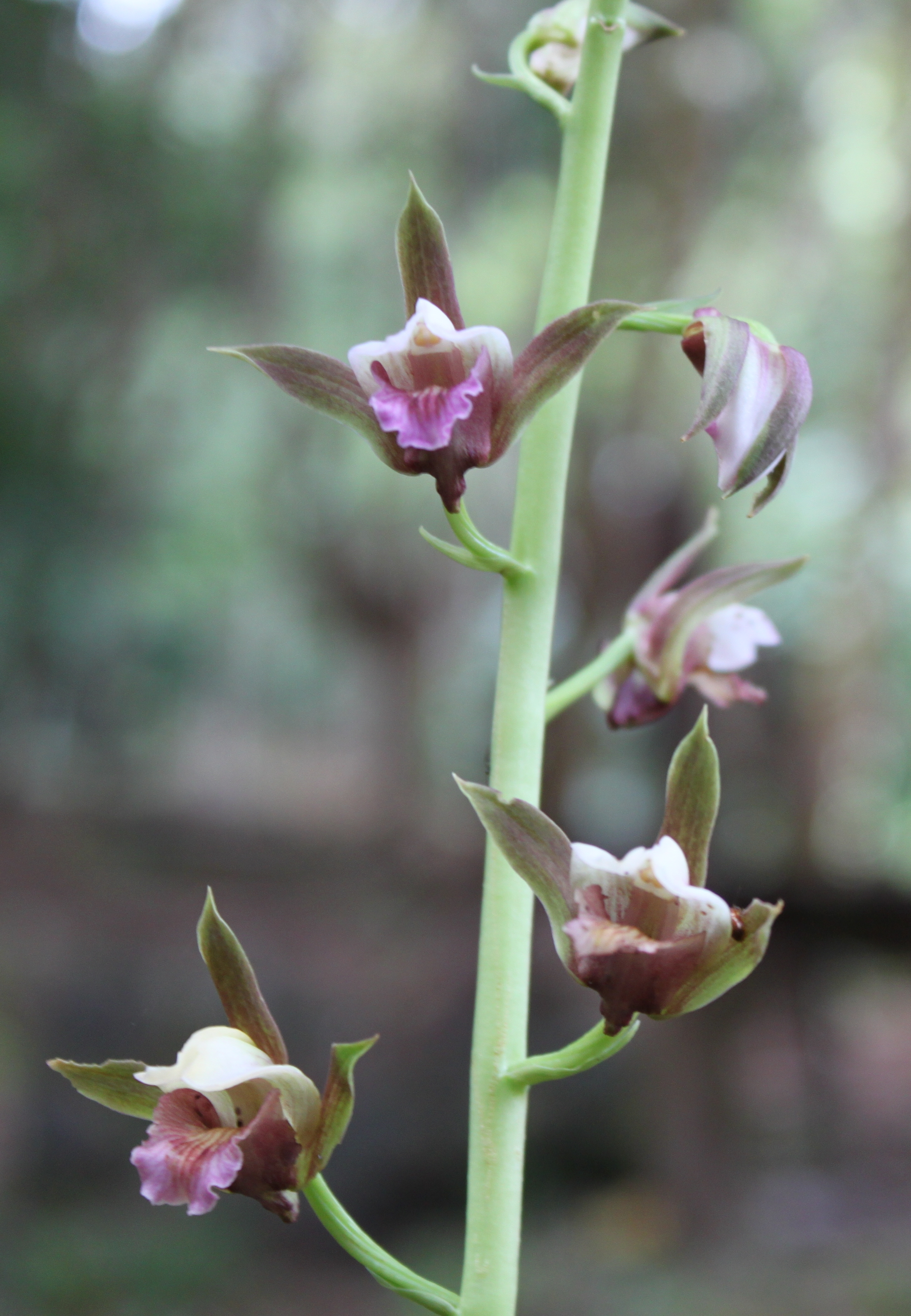
Eulophia nuda

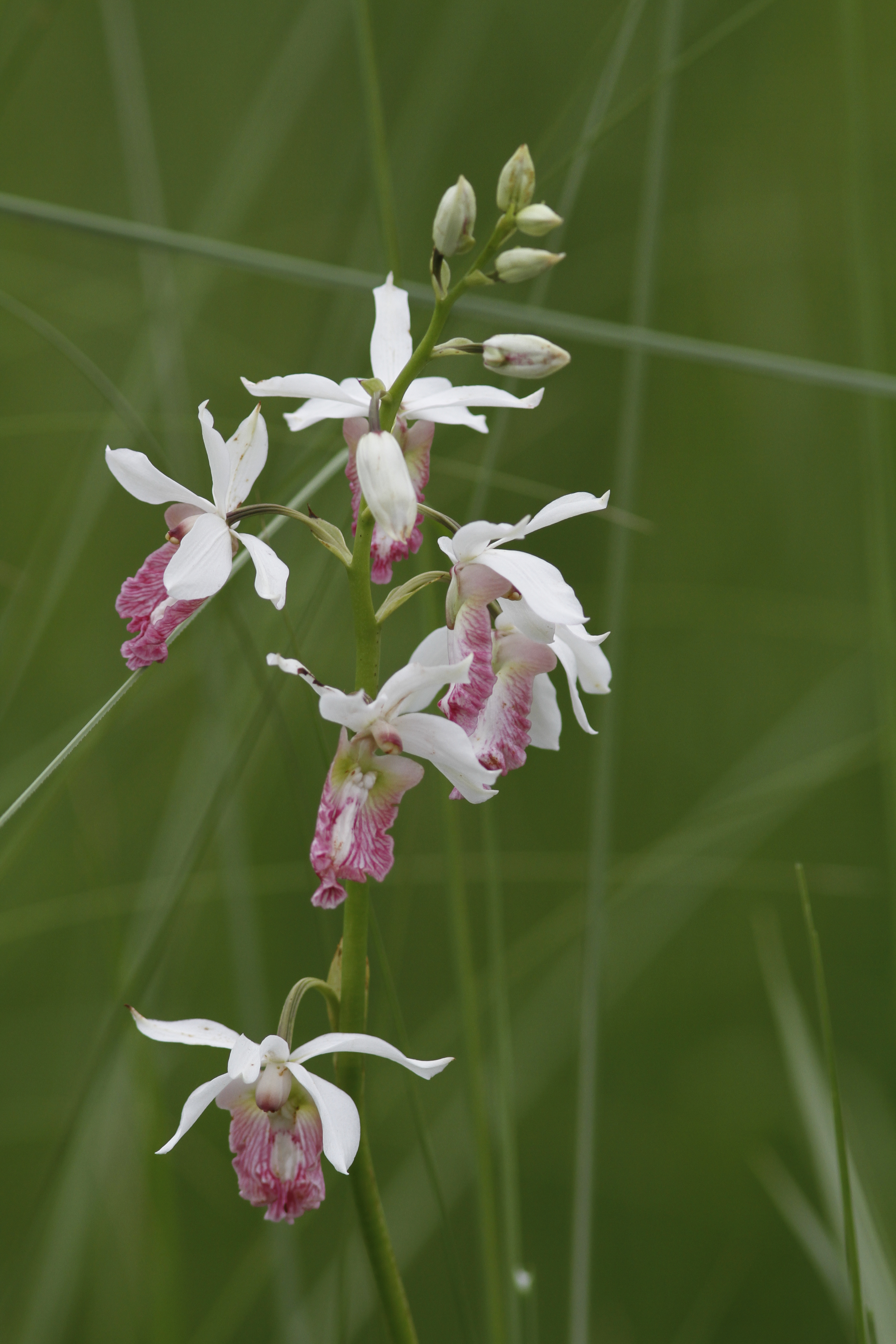
Eulophia obtusa

Eulophia graminea
