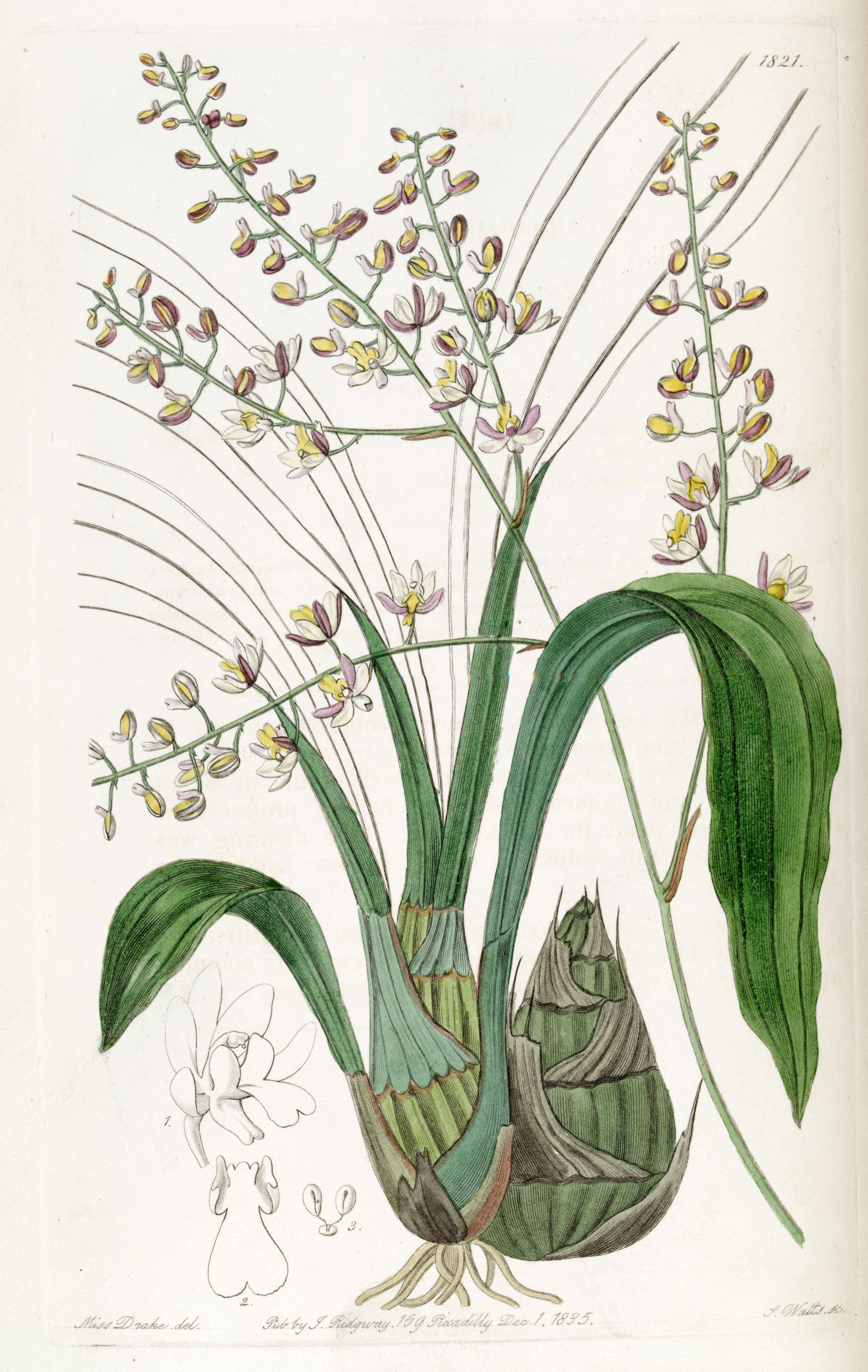
- Graphorkis lurida artist:Sarah Drake, 1836

Scientific classification
- Kingdom: Plantae
- Clade: Tracheophytes
- Clade: Angiosperms
- Clade: Monocots
- Order: Asparagales
- Family: Orchidaceae
- Subfamily: Epidendroideae
- Tribe: Cymbidieae
- Subtribe: Eulophiinae
- Genus: Graphorkis; Thouars

Species
- Graphorkis concolor (Thouars) Kuntze; Graphorkis ecalcarata (Schltr.) Summerh.; Graphorkis lurida (Sw.) Kuntze; Graphorkis medemiae (Schltr.) Summerh.

Synonyms
- Eulophiopsis Pfitzer; Graphorchis Thouars

= Graphorkis =

Genus of orchids

Graphorkis is a genus of flowering plants from the orchid family, Orchidaceae. It contains 4 known species, native to Africa and to Madagascar and other islands of the Indian Ocean.

== See also ==
- List of Orchidaceae genera
