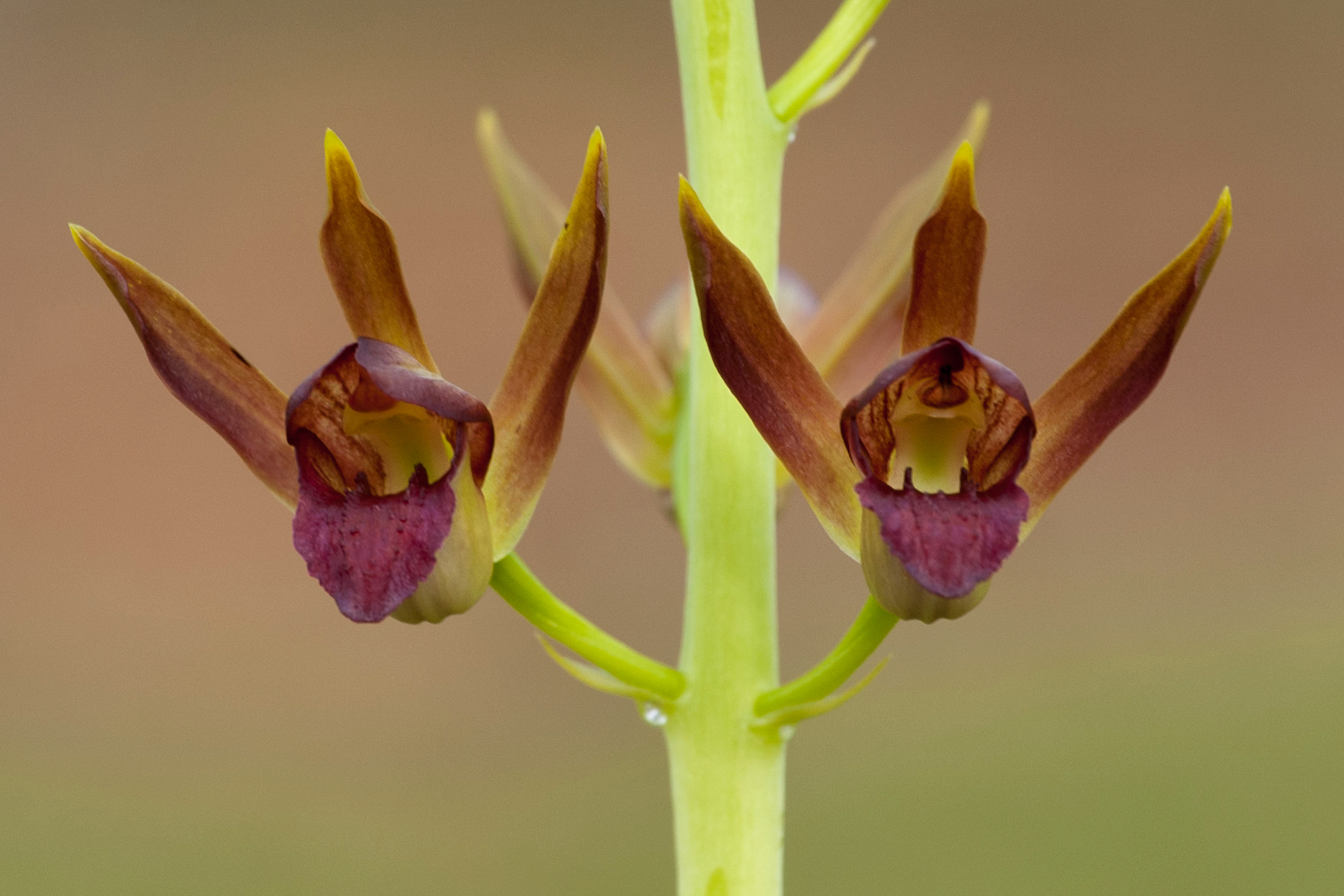

Scientific classification
- Kingdom: Plantae
- Clade: Tracheophytes
- Clade: Angiosperms
- Clade: Monocots
- Order: Asparagales
- Family: Orchidaceae
- Subfamily: Epidendroideae
- Genus: Eulophia
- Species: E. alta

Binomial name
- Eulophia alta (L.) Fawc. & Rendle

Synonyms
- Limodorum altum L.; Bletia alta (L.) Hitchc.; Cypripedium epidendricum Vell.; Cyrtopera alta (L.) Stehlé; Cyrtopera amazonica Barb.Rodr.; Cyrtopera longifolia (Kunth) Rchb.f.; Cyrtopera longifolia var. amazonica (Barb.Rodr.) Cogn.; Cyrtopera longifolia var. pachystelidia Rchb.f.; Cyrtopera vellosiana Barb.Rodr.; Cyrtopera woodfordii Sims; Cyrtopodium woodfordii Sims; Dendrobium longifolium Kunth; Eulophia alta f. flavescens (Schltr.) F. Barros; Eulophia alta f. pallida P.M.Br.; Eulophia alta f. pelchatii P.M.Br.; Eulophia alta var. alba L.C. Menezes; Eulophia alta var. pachystelidia (Rchb.f.) G.A. Romero; Eulophia longifolia (Kunth) Schltr.; Eulophia longifolia var. amazonica (Barb.Rodr.) Cogn.; Eulophia longifolia var. flavescens Schltr.; Eulophia woodfordii (Sims) Rolfe; Lissochilus amazonicus Barb.Rodr.; Maxillaria longifolia (Kunth) Lindl.; Paphiopedilum epidendricum (Vell.) Pfitzer; Platypus altus (L.) Small; Platypus papilliferus Small; Xylobium longifolium (Kunth) Lindl. ex Spreng.

= Eulophia alta =

Wild coco

Species of orchid

Eulophia alta is a species of orchid, known as the wild coco. It is widespread across tropical and subtropical parts of Africa, South America, Central America, Mexico and the West Indies, as well as the southeastern United States (states of Georgia and Florida).
