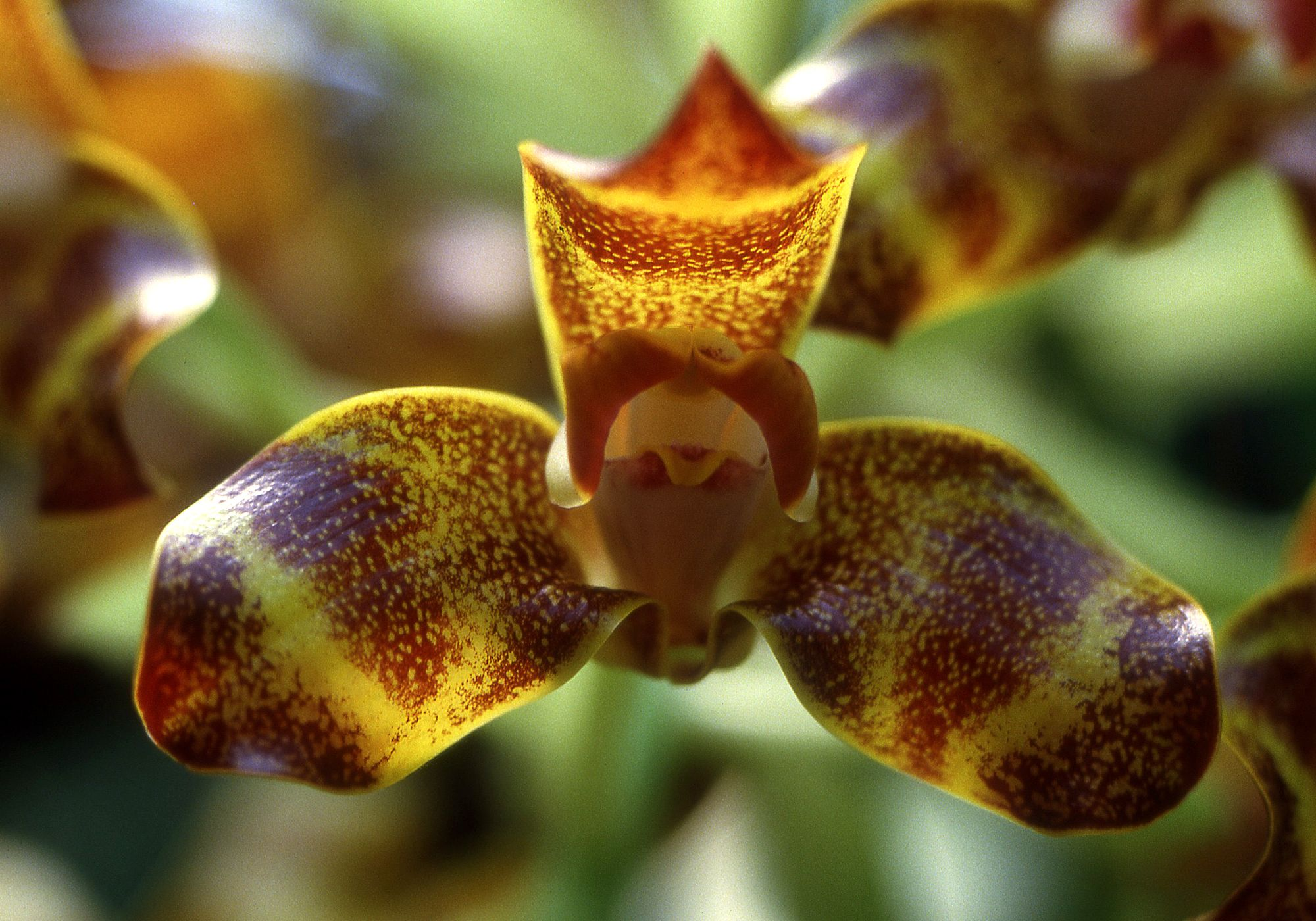

Scientific classification
- Kingdom: Plantae
- Clade: Tracheophytes
- Clade: Angiosperms
- Clade: Monocots
- Order: Asparagales
- Family: Orchidaceae
- Subfamily: Epidendroideae
- Genus: Grammangis
- Species: G. ellisii

Binomial name
- Grammangis ellisii (Lindl.) Rchb.f.

Synonyms
- Grammatophyllum ellisii Lindl.; Gabertia ellisii (Lindl.) Gaudich. in B.Stein; Grammangis ellisii var. dayanum Rchb.f.; Grammangis fallax Schltr.

= Grammangis ellisii =

Species of orchid

Grammangis ellisii is a species of flowering plants in the family Orchidaceae endemic to the eastern forests of Madagascar. The pseudobulbs have deciduous bracts and the leaves are 15–40 cm long by 1.5–4 cm wide. The flowers are produced in January at the same time as new vegetative growth with 15-40 flowers being produced at a time. The flowers themselves are chestnut brown with speckled yellow dotting and a white center.

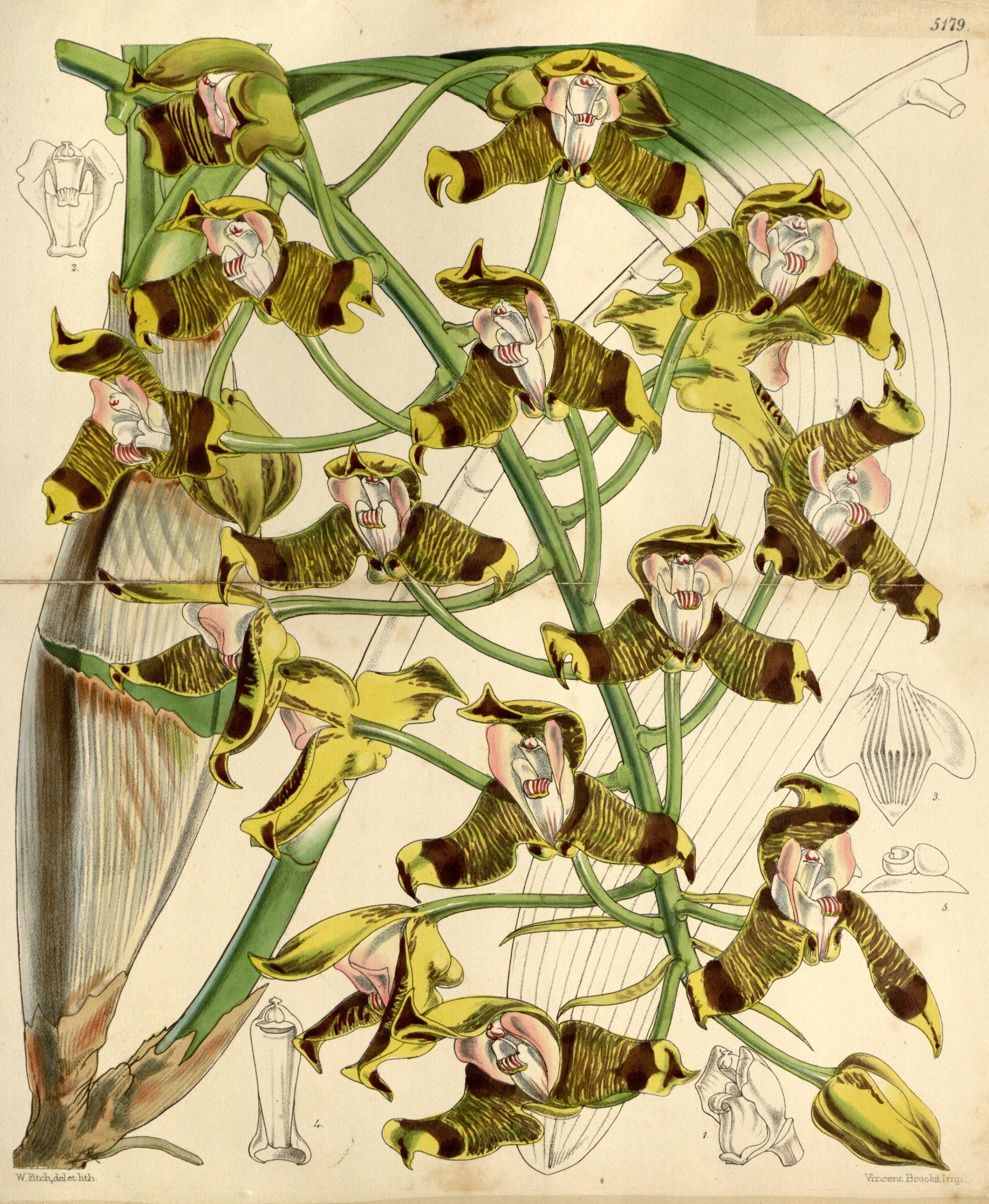
1860 Illustration from Curtis's Botanical Magazine
