= Mananara =

Mananara may refer to:

- Mananara Avaratra (Mananara Nord), a city in the region of Analanjirofo, Madagascar
- Mananara River (Analanjirofo), a river in the region of Analanjirofo, Madagascar
- Mananara River, a river in the region of Atsimo-Atsinanana, Madagascar
- Mananara River (Betsiboka), a river in the central highlands of Madagascar, an affluent of the Betsiboka River
- Mananara Nord National Park, a national park in the region of Analanjirofo, Madagascar
- Mananara Sud - a river in southern Madagascar
