= Mananara Avaratra District =

Mananara Avaratra Mananara Nord
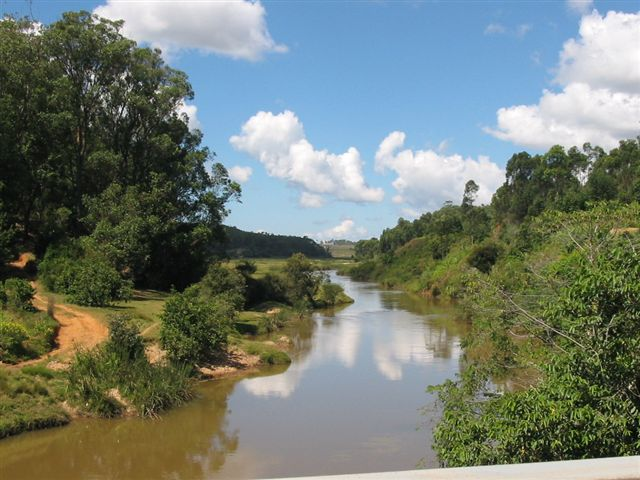
- North Mananara River

- Location in Madagascar
- Coordinates: 16°10′S 49°46′E
- Country: Madagascar
- Region: Ambatosoa

Area
  - Total: 4,487 km^{2} (1,732 sq mi)
- Elevation: 12 m (39 ft)

Population (2020)
  - Total: 261,784
  - Density: 58.34/km^{2} (151.1/sq mi)
- Time zone: UTC3 (EAT)
- code: 511

Mananara Avaratra is a district of Ambatosoa in Madagascar. The district has an area of 4,487 km^{2} (1,732 sq mi), and the estimated population in 2020 was 261,784.

== Communes ==
The district is further divided into 16 communes:

- Ambatoharanana
- Ambodiampana
- Ambodivoanio
- Analanampotsy
- Andasibe
- Antanambaobe
- Antanambe
- Antanananivo
- Imorona
- Mahanoro
- Manambolosy
- Mananara Nord
- Sandrakatsy
- Saromaona
- Tanibe
- Vanono
