= Andasibe, Vavatenina =

Andasibe
- Location in Madagascar
- Coordinates: 17°20′S 48°54′E
- Country: Madagascar
- Region: Analanjirofo
- District: Vavatenina

Area
  - Total: 710 km^{2} (270 sq mi)
- Elevation: 554 m (1,818 ft)

Population (2018)
  - Total: 25,831
  - Density: 39/km^{2} (100/sq mi)
- Time zone: UTC3 (EAT)
- Postal code: 518

Andasibe is a town and commune (Malagasy: kaominina) in Madagascar. It belongs to the district of Vavatenina, which is a part of Analanjirofo Region. The population of the commune was estimated to be approximately 25,831 in 2018.

The commune is divided in 11 fokontany in 116 villages. It is situated at 29 km from Vavatenina, of which are 17 km on the RN22 and 12 km of unpaved roads.

== Rivers ==
- Maningory River
