= Scoliciosporum abietinum =

Scientific classification
- Kingdom: Fungi
- Division: Ascomycota
- Class: Lecanoromycetes
- Order: Lecanorales
- Family: Scoliciosporaceae
- Genus: Scoliciosporum
- Species: S. abietinum

Binomial name
- Scoliciosporum abietinum T.Sprib. (2009)

Species of lichen

Scoliciosporum abietinum is a little-known species of crustose lichen in the family Scoliciosporaceae. This tiny lichen forms minute white to grey-white crusty patches only 0.3–0.6 mm across that grow directly on the living needles and leaves of conifer trees such as grand fir and western redcedar. It is found in the humid inland rainforests of southern British Columbia and northwestern Montana, where only four collections have been made, making it both rare and easily overlooked due to its extremely small size.

== Taxonomy ==
The species was described in 2009 by Toby Spribille in a paper introducing eight new inland-rain-forest lichens. The holotype was collected from green needles of grand fir (Abies grandis) beside the Bull River, Sanders County, Montana. The epithet abietinum ("fir-dwelling") alludes to that substrate. Although placed provisionally in Scoliciosporum, the lichen is morphologically unusual for the genus: its spores are non-septate and its conidia are short and peanut-shaped, whereas most other in the genus have multiseptate, helical ascospores and thread-like conidia. The ascus structure also hints at affinities with Byssoloma or even the Lecanoraceae, so the correct generic position may change once DNA data become available.

== Description ==
Scoliciosporum abietinum forms minute, crust-like patches only 0.3–0.6 mm across. The thallus is white to grey-white and often breaks into tiny, radiating lobules; beneath it a dark blue-green hypothallus (a layer of fungal filaments) is visible. No distinct cortex develops—the algal partner (rounded, jelly-sheathed green cells about 13–17 μm in diameter) is scattered through the upper part of the crust, while the lower part is full of air spaces and minute, light-reflecting crystals. Round fruit-bodies (apothecia) sit more or less flush with the surface, usually in the thallus centre; they measure 0.05–0.13 mm, with a bluish-black, matt disc and a thin, whitish rim that tends to disappear as the apothecium ages. Internal sections show a colourless hypothecium, a strongly gelled, 24–28 μm-tall hymenium, and asci with a Ectolechiaceae-type apex (a broad, amyloid tube surrounded by a darker ring). Each ascus releases eight simple, ellipsoid spores just 4.5–5 × 2 μm. Immersed, flask-shaped pycnidia produce broadly ellipsoid conidia roughly 4 × 2 μm. Standard spot tests are negative and thin-layer chromatography detected no secondary metabolites; the apothecia contain a dull grey-green pigment (Cinereorufa-green).

== Habitat and distribution ==
Scoliciosporum abietinum is a foliicolous (leaf-inhabiting) lichen restricted to the humid inland rain-forest belt of southern British Columbia and adjacent north-western Montana. All confirmed records come from low-elevation mixed-conifer stands where the climate is warm and persistently moist. It grows on living foliage—particularly 1-year to 5-year-old needles of grand fir and the scale leaves of western redcedar (Thuja plicata)—usually on branches high enough to remain above the winter snowpack and open to rainfall. Associated leaf lichens include Byssoloma subdiscordans, Fellhanera bouteillei and Scoliciosporum umbrinum. Only four collections are known, and repeated searches farther north have failed to locate additional populations, suggesting the species is both rare and easily overlooked because of its minute size.
