= Ambohibe =

- Location in Madagascar
- Coordinates: 17°27′S 49°7′E
- Country: Madagascar
- Region: Analanjirofo
- District: Vavatenina

Government
  - Mayor: Amédée Rantoandro
- Elevation: 217 m (712 ft)

Population (2001)
  - Total: 16,000
- Time zone: UTC3 (EAT)
- Postal code: 518
- Climate: Af

Ambohibe is a rural municipality in Madagascar. It belongs to the district of Vavatenina, which is a part of Analanjirofo Region. The population of the commune was estimated to be approximately 16,000 in 2001 commune census.

Primary and junior level secondary education are available in town. The majority 95% of the population of the commune are farmers. The most important crop is coffee, while other important products are bananas, cloves and lychee. Services provide employment for 5% of the population.

== Geography ==
Ambohibe is situated at 13 km West from Vavatenina, 7 km along the paved National road 22 and 6 km on an unpaved, secondary road. 14 fokontany in 67 villages are part of this municipality. 43 of these villages do not have running water.
