= Scoliciosporum arachnoideum =

Scientific classification
- Kingdom: Fungi
- Division: Ascomycota
- Class: Lecanoromycetes
- Order: Lecanorales
- Family: Scoliciosporaceae
- Genus: Scoliciosporum
- Species: S. arachnoideum

Binomial name
- Scoliciosporum arachnoideum Aptroot (2008)
- Holotype: Andasibe, Madagascar

Species of lichen

Scoliciosporum arachnoideum is a species of corticolous (bark-dwelling) crustose lichen in the family Scoliciosporaceae. This lichen forms whitish grey, powdery crusts underlain by a conspicuous cobweb-like ("arachnoid") network of fungal filaments that gives the species its name, and produces abundant pale ochre fruiting bodies covered in white crystalline frost. It is known only from a single tree in the humid mountain rainforests near Andasibe, Madagascar, where it was discovered in 1984, making it potentially endemic to the island.

== Taxonomy ==
Scoliciosporum arachnoideum was first described in 2008 by André Aptroot from a collection made in Madagascar's eastern rainforests. The holotype was gathered near Andasibe (Perinet) at 950 m elevation during a joint expedition by Aptroot and R. Hensen in 1984. The species name refers to the distinctive "arachnoid" (cobweb-like) network of fungal filaments that make up its basal tissue (hypothallus and prothallus). Although it superficially resembles Scoliciosporum pruinosum, it differs by having a darker, olive-toned hypothecium and excipulum and by the distinctive cobwebby margins.

Subsequent authors suggest that, although Scoliciosporum in the strict sense appears distinct (sometimes treated in Scoliciosporaceae), S. arachnoideum may instead align with Ramalinaceae near Jarmania and Myrionora (the Bacidia lutescens group) and could ultimately belong in Jarmania.

== Description ==
The thallus of S. arachnoideum is crustose and whitish grey, appearing dull and powdery (leprose). It is formed by the merging of tiny, granule-like fragments and is underlain by a thin, white, cobweb-like hypothallus that may spread over areas up to 50 cm across. The margins are set off by a conspicuous, white, arachnoid prothallus that can extend into bark crevices. The photobiont comprises green algal cells that are rounded to ellipsoid and measure about 5 micrometres (μm) in diameter.

Apothecia (disc-like fruiting bodies) are abundant, 0.3–0.8 mm across, usually rounded and slightly raised. They are pale ochre with a conspicuous white granular frost (pruina). Over time, new apothecia can arise in clusters from the remnants of older ones. Internally, the excipulum (rim) is pale brown but also coated with white pruina; in section it appears olive to bluish-green. The hypothecium (layer beneath the spore-bearing region) is dark brown to bluish olive-black. Spores (ascospores) are colourless, long and slender, strongly curved like a corkscrew, and usually three-septate, measuring 30–40 × 1–2 μm. No asexual reproductive structures (pycnidia) were seen. Chemically, the thallus reacts with potassium hydroxide solution (K+ yellow) and contains atranorin; the crystalline pruina consists of an unknown compound, distinct from the lobaric acid found in S. pruinosum.

== Habitat and distribution ==
The species is known only from the type locality: a single, unidentified tree in humid tropical mountain forest near Andasibe, Madagascar, at 950 m elevation. The lichen formed a nearly continuous covering on one side of the tree. The site is characterised by very wet rainforest with abundant vascular epiphytes such as ferns and pendant lycopods, and common trees of the area included species of Pandanus with small leaves and many branches. Since no similar material has been reported from elsewhere, Scoliciosporum arachnoideum is considered potentially endemic to Madagascar.
