= Antanambe (disambiguation) =

Antanambe may refer to municipalities in Madagascar:

- Antanambe, in Analanjirofo
- Antanambe, Diana, in Diana Region
