= Ambatoharanana (disambiguation) =

Ambatoharanana stands for the name of several Malagasy villages:

- Ambatoharanana, a village in Fenerive Est District, Analanjirofo.
- Ambatoharanana, Mananara Nord, a village near Mananara Nord in Analanjirofo.
- Ambatoharanana, Vavatenina, a village near Vavatenina, Analanjirofo.
- Ambatoharanana, Anosibe An'ala, a village near Anosibe An'ala, Alaotra-Mangoro.

There is also a fokontany (village) in the municipality of Antanifotsy with this name, and also in Ihadilanana, in Amoron'i Mania (near Ambrosita).
