= C13H8O2 =

The molecular formula C_{13}H_{8}O_{2} (molar mass: 196.20 g/mol, exact mass: 196.0524 u) may refer to:

- Fluorone
- Xanthone
