= Analanampotsy =

Analampotsy
- Location in Madagascar
- Coordinates: 17°10′S 49°29′E
- Country: Madagascar
- Region: Ambatosoa
- District: Mananara Nord
- Elevation: 12 m (39 ft)

Population (2018)
  - Total: 16,987
- Time zone: UTC+3 (EAT)

Analampotsy is a town and commune (Malagasy: kaominina) in Ambatosoa, Madagascar. It belongs to the district of Mananara Nord. The population of the commune was estimated to be approximately 16,987 in 2018.

It is located north of Fenoarivo Atsinanana (Fenerive Est) on the National Road 5 between Maroantsetra and Toamasina just after the Maningory River bridge. Analampotsy is west of Mananara Nord proper.
