= Rakotomandimby Stanislas Zafilahy =

Malagasy politician

Rakotomandimby Stanislas Zafilahy is a Malagasy politician. A member of the National Assembly of Madagascar, he was elected in the 2007 Malagasy parliamentary elections as a member of the Tiako I Madagasikara party; he represents the constituency of Vavatenina.

He also was the deputy of this constituency from 2002-2007.
