= Anjahambe =

- Location in Madagascar
- Coordinates: 17°23′S 49°8′E
- Country: Madagascar
- Region: Analanjirofo
- District: Vavatenina

Government
  - Maire: Isidore Ratovoarison

Area
  - Total: 81 km^{2} (31 sq mi)
- Elevation: 176 m (577 ft)

Population (2014)
  - Total: 12,498
- Time zone: UTC3 (EAT)
- Postal code: 518

Anjahambe is a municipality in Madagascar. It belongs to the district of Vavatenina, which is a part of Analanjirofo Region. The population of the commune was 12498 in 2014.

Primary and junior level secondary education are available in this town. The majority 90% of the population of the commune are farmers, while an additional 5% receives their livelihood from raising livestock. The most important crops are rice and bananas, while other important agricultural products are coffee, cloves and vanilla. Services provide employment for 5% of the population.

== Roads ==
Anjahambe is situated at 17 km from Vavatenina on the RN 22 to Fenoarivo Atsinanana (Fénérive) (53 km to the National road 5). It lies at the Maningory River.
