= Antanambaobe =

Antanambaobe Antanambao Be
- Location in Madagascar
- Coordinates: 16°15′S 49°40′E
- Country: Madagascar
- Region: Ambatosoa
- District: Mananara Nord
- Elevation: 175 m (574 ft)

Population (2001)
  - Total: 14,000
- Time zone: UTC+3 (EAT)

Antanambaobe (other spelling: Antanambao Be) is a rural municipality in Ambatosoa, Madagascar. It belongs to the district of Mananara Nord. The population of the commune was estimated to be approximately 14,000 in 2001.

Primary and junior level secondary education are available in town. The majority 80% of the population of the commune are farmers. The most important crop is cloves, while other important products are coffee and vanilla. Services provide employment for 20% of the population.

== Geography ==
Ananambaobe is situated on the Mananara Nord River.
