= Echinodontium ryvardenii =

Conservation status
- Endangered (IUCN 3.1)

Scientific classification
- Kingdom: Fungi
- Division: Basidiomycota
- Class: Agaricomycetes
- Order: Russulales
- Family: Echinodontiaceae
- Genus: Echinodontium
- Species: E. ryvardenii

Binomial name
- Echinodontium ryvardenii Bernicchia & Piga (1998)

Species of fungus

Echinodontium ryvardenii is a rare species of fungus in the family Echinodontiaceae, described in 1998 and named in honour of the mycologist Leif Ryvarden. The fungus produces woody, perennial fruit bodies with distinctive ashen-grey, teeth-like structures on its spore-bearing surface, and grows parasitically on ancient Juniperus phoenicea trees in Sardinia, Italy. As the first European representative of a genus previously known only from North America and Asia, E. ryvardenii is considered an evolutionary relict with fewer than 600 mature individuals remaining, earning it an endangered status on the IUCN Red List.

== Taxonomy ==
Echinodontium ryvardenii belongs to the genus Echinodontium within the family Echinodontiaceae. The species was first formally described in 1998 by the mycologists Annarosa Bernicchia and Andrea Piga in the journal Mycotaxon. The specific epithet ryvardenii honours Leif Ryvarden, a renowned Norwegian mycologist who has made significant contributions to the study of polypores.

Prior to the discovery of E. ryvardenii, all known species of Echinodontium were from North America or Asia, making this the first European representative of the genus. Based on morphological characteristics, E. ryvardenii is positioned taxonomically between E. japonicum and E. tsugicola, but with several distinctive features that clearly separate it from both. The presence of a conspicuous, undulating dark line near the substrate is a distinctive character that differentiates E. ryvardenii from other species in the genus while making it taxonomically close to Laurilia sulcata, a corticioid species that many mycologists exclude from Echinodontium. This similarity suggests that E. ryvardenii could represent an evolutionary link between the two genera, potentially warranting a reconsideration of the systematic position of Laurilia sulcata.

As a species found only in Sardinia, an island with unique ecological characteristics, E. ryvardenii is considered a relict taxon – possibly representing the remnant of a previously wider distribution of the genus across Europe before becoming geographically isolated.

== Description ==
The basidiocarps (fruiting bodies) of Echinodontium ryvardenii are perennial, woody, and conchate (shell-shaped) to effused-reflexed or occasionally resupinate (flat against the substrate). They typically measure 2–6 cm long, 1–3 cm wide, and 0.4–0.8 cm thick, and may occur singly or in overlapping groups. The sterile upper surface, when present, is tomentose-rugose (hairy and wrinkled), zonate (with concentric zones), and brown to brownish-black with paler margins. The margin is 1–2 mm wide, pubescent-tomentose, rounded then acute, and undulating.

The hymenophore (spore-bearing surface) is a distinctive ashen to silvery grey colour, which remains unchanged when dry. It is characterised by scattered teeth similar to stalactites, sometimes fused to form aggregate tubercules measuring 1–5 mm long and 0.5–1 mm wide, with rounded tips. These teeth remain fertile even when few basidia (spore-producing structures) are present.

The context (inner tissue) is firm and zonate, 2–3 mm thick, ranging from pale brown to brown. A distinctive feature is the blackish resinous line visible in cross-section next to the substrate, where the skeletal hyphae are dark and thick-walled.

The hyphal system is dimitic, consisting of two types of hyphae:

- Generative hyphae: hyaline (transparent), branched, with clamps but also with simple septa, thin-walled, 2.0–3.5 micrometres (μm) in diameter
- Skeletal hyphae: thick-walled to solid, 3.0–5.5 μm in diameter, with few branches, straight to slightly sinuous, rarely clamped, hyaline to pale brown, darkening in potassium hydroxide (KOH) solution

The hymenium (fertile layer) is hyaline, about 60–70 μm thick, with a continuous subhymenium up to 200–220 μm thick. Numerous cystidia (sterile cells) are present, club-shaped to fusiform, particularly crowded along the margins and in smooth areas between the teeth. These cystidia are initially hyaline then light brown, darkening in KOH solution. They have thin walls that later become thick-walled to solid, with encrusted upper portions. The encrustations measure 45–50 (rarely up to 70) × 7–8–9 μm, and are particularly evident in the fertile part of the teeth. These crystals have a bi-pyramidal shape.

The basidia (spore-producing cells) are clavate (club-shaped), sinuous, hyaline, measuring 30–40 × 6–8 μm, each with four sterigmata about 5 μm long. Basidiospores are hyaline, ellipsoid, very abundant, measuring 6.5–7.5–8.0 × 4.5–5.8 μm. They are amyloid (staining blue-black in iodine), have thickened walls, and appear almost smooth under oil immersion but warted to rough when viewed under scanning electron microscopy.

== Conservation ==
Echinodontium ryvardenii is classified as an endangered species on the IUCN Red List, with a global population estimated at fewer than 600 mature individuals. The fungus has an extremely restricted distribution, currently confirmed only from three small areas in Sardinia, Italy, where it has been documented on about 25 ancient juniper trees. At one site, the original host trunk has already been cut down, highlighting the vulnerability of this species to habitat loss.

The fungus specifically requires very old ("pluricentenari") living specimens of Juniperus phoenicea and, to a lesser extent, J. macrocarpa to fruit, colonizing primarily dead parts of these living trees. These ancient Mediterranean juniper habitats, classified as arborescent matorral (Natura 2000 code 5210), may represent glacial refugia and support numerous other fungi with highly restricted distributions. The habitat is in danger of disappearing as old juniper trees are frequently cut for firewood and construction materials.

Conservation efforts must focus on protecting all remaining sites where E. ryvardenii occurs and ensuring younger juniper trees at these locations are allowed to reach old age and die naturally. Without such protection, the continuing decline in suitable habitat threatens the long-term survival of this species, which researchers suggest may represent an important evolutionary link between different fungal genera.
