= Ambodiampana =

Ambodiampana may refer to one of the following locations in Madagascar:

- Ambodiampana, Mananara Nord in Mananara Nord District, Analanjirofo Region
- Ambodiampana, Sambava in Sambava District, Sava Region
- Ambodiampana, Soanierana Ivongo in Soanierana Ivongo District, Analanjirofo Region
