= Imorona =

- Location in Madagascar
- Coordinates: 16°12′S 49°50′E
- Country: Madagascar
- Region: Ambatosoa
- District: Mananara Nord
- Elevation: 12 m (39 ft)

Population (2018)
  - Total: 7,413
- Time zone: UTC+3 (EAT)

Imorona is a commune (Malagasy: kaominina) in Ambatosoa, Madagascar. It belongs to the district of Mananara Nord. The population of the commune was estimated to be approximately 7,413 in 2018.

It is situated at the National Road 5 between Maroantsetra and Toamasina.

== Nature ==
The Mananara-Nord National Park is near this commune.
