= Maromitety =

- Location in Madagascar
- Coordinates: 17°29′S 49°17′E
- Country: Madagascar
- Region: Analanjirofo
- District: Vavatenina

Area
  - Total: 127 km^{2} (49 sq mi)
- Elevation: 177 m (581 ft)

Population (2017)
  - Total: 20,896
- Time zone: UTC3 (EAT)
- Postal code: 518

Maromitety is a municipality in Madagascar. It belongs to the district of Vavatenina, which is a part of Analanjirofo Region. The population of the municipality was 20896.

Only primary schooling is available. The majority 96% of the population of the commune are farmers. The most important crop is rice, while other important products are bananas, coffee and cloves. Services provide employment for 4% of the population.

== Road ==
This municipality lies at the National Road 22.
