= Vavatenina District =

- Location in Madagascar
- Coordinates: 17°31′S 48°57′E
- Country: Madagascar
- Region: Analanjirofo
- District: Vavatenina

Area
  - Total: 2,926 km^{2} (1,130 sq mi)
- Elevation: 549 m (1,801 ft)

Population (2020)
  - Total: 202,529
  - Density: 69.22/km^{2} (179.3/sq mi)
- Time zone: UTC3 (EAT)
- Postal code: 518

Vavatenina District is a district of northeast Madagascar. It is part of the Analanjirofo Region. The district has an area of 2,671 km^{2} (1,031 sq mi), and the estimated population in 2020 was 202,529.

== Communes ==
The district is further divided into 11 communes:

- Ambatoharanana
- Ambodimangavalo
- Ambohibe
- Ampasimazava
- Andasibe
- Anjahambe
- Maromitety
- Miarinarivo
- Sahatavy
- Tanamarina
- Vavatenina

== Rivers ==
The main river is the Maningory River.

== Roads ==
The capital of the district, Vavatenina is situated at 45 km from Fénérive-Est, by the National Road 5 and National Road 22.

== Economy ==
The region is one of the most important clove growing areas of Madagascar.
