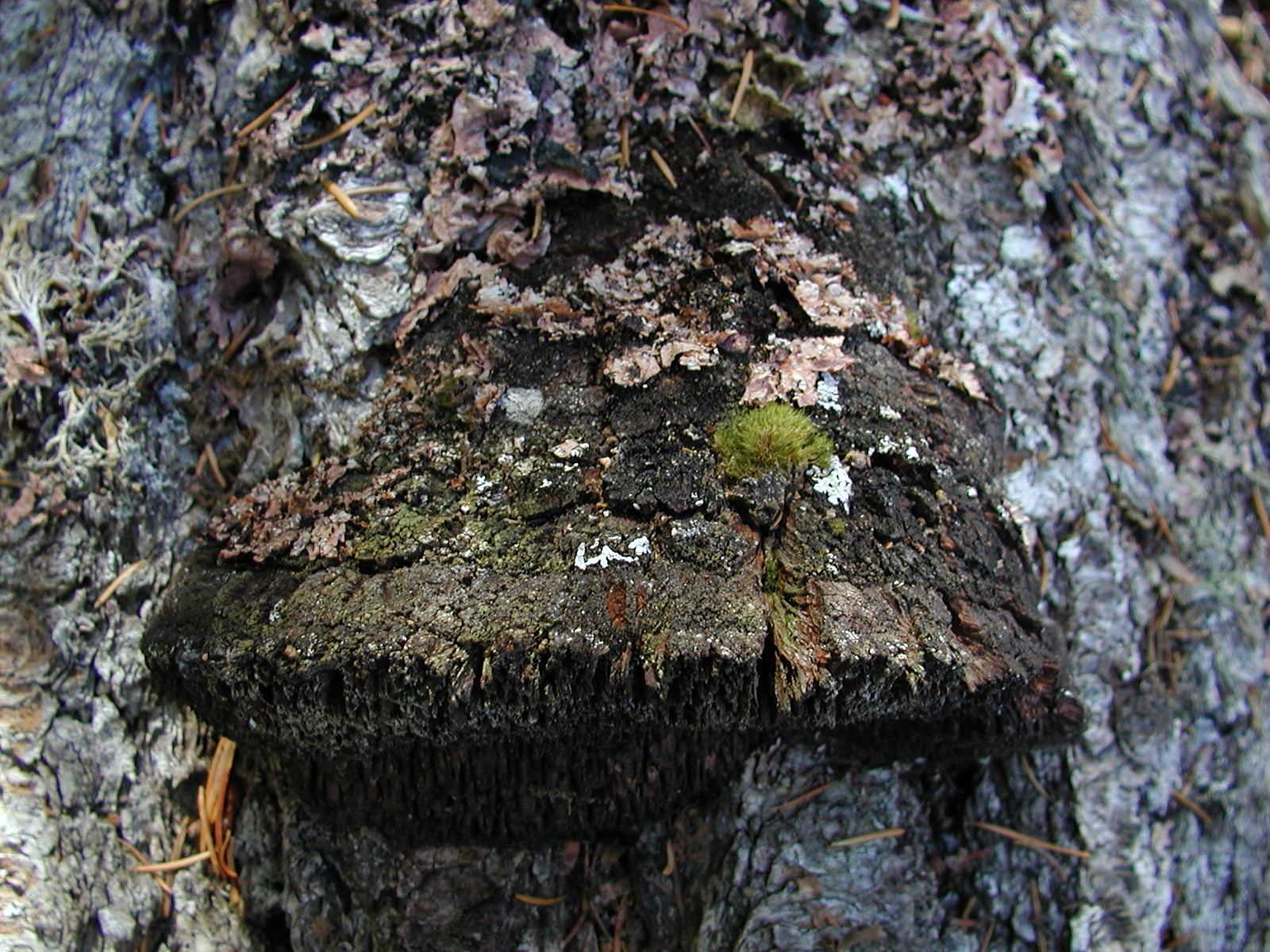

Scientific classification
- Kingdom: Fungi
- Division: Basidiomycota
- Class: Agaricomycetes
- Order: Russulales
- Family: Echinodontiaceae
- Genus: Echinodontium
- Species: E. tinctorium

Binomial name
- Echinodontium tinctorium (Ellis & Everh.) Ellis & Everh. (1900) [as tinctorius]

Synonyms
- Fomes tinctorius Ellis & Everh. (1895); Hydnum tinctorium (Ellis & Everh.) Lloyd (1898); Scindalma tinctorium (Ellis & Everh.) Kuntze (1898); Hydnofomes tinctorius (Ellis & Everh.) Lloyd (1920)

= Echinodontium tinctorium =

Species of fungus

Echinodontium tinctorium
- Mycological characteristics
- Teeth on hymenium
- No distinct cap
- Hymenium attachment is not applicable
- Lacks a stipe
- Spore print is white
- Ecology is parasitic
- Edibility is inedible

Echinodontium tinctorium, commonly known as the Indian paint fungus or toothed conk, is a species of fungus in the family Echinodontiaceae. It is a plant pathogen. Found on tree species such as grand fir (and indicating a rotten core).

== Description ==
Growing to 8–20 centimetres (3–8 in) wide, it can be identified by the grayish spines of its lower surface. The flesh is reddish-brown and woody.

=== Similar species ===
Similar species include the rare Echinodontium ballouii, as well as various conks which have pores rather than teeth below.

== Uses ==
Native Americans used the red interior as a pigment. Some Plateau Indian tribes applied the fungus to skin to prevent it from chapping. It is inedible.
