= Picea parsonsii =

Picea parsonsii may refer to:

- Picea parsonsii Fowler, 1872, a synonym of Abies concolor
- Picea parsonsii Gordon, 1862, a synonym of Abies grandis
