= Miarinarivo, Vavatenina =

Miarinarivo
- Location in Madagascar
- Coordinates: 17°39′S 49°6′E
- Country: Madagascar
- Region: Analanjirofo
- District: Vavatenina
- Elevation: 419 m (1,375 ft)

Population (2001)
  - Total: 24,000
- Time zone: UTC3 (EAT)

Miarinarivo is a town and commune (Malagasy: kaominina) in Madagascar. It belongs to the district of Vavatenina, which is a part of Analanjirofo Region. The population of the commune was estimated to be approximately 24,000 in 2001 commune census.

Primary and junior level secondary education are available in town. The majority 90% of the population of the commune are farmers. The most important crop is rice, while other important products are coffee and cloves. Services provide employment for 10% of the population.
