= Ambatoharanana, Vavatenina =

Ambatoharanana Ambatoharanana I
- Location in Madagascar
- Coordinates: 17°18′S 49°7′E
- Country: Madagascar
- Region: Analanjirofo
- District: Vavatenina
- Elevation: 333 m (1,093 ft)

Population (2001)
  - Total: 15,000
- Time zone: UTC3 (EAT)

For other places called Ambatoharanana, please see: Ambatoharanana (disambiguation)

Ambatoharanana I is a rural municipality in Madagascar. It belongs to the district of Vavatenina, which is a part of Analanjirofo Region. The population of the commune was estimated to be approximately 15,000 in the 2001 commune census.

Only primary schooling is available. The majority 90% of the population of the commune are farmers, while an additional 6% receive their livelihood from raising livestock. The most important crops are rice and cloves; coffee is also an important agricultural product. Services provide employment for 4% of the population.
