= Sahatavy =

- Location in Madagascar
- Coordinates: 17°26′56″S 48°59′43″E
- Country: Madagascar
- Region: Analanjirofo
- District: Vavatenina
- Elevation: 236 m (774 ft)

Population (2018)
  - Total: 16,334
- Time zone: UTC3 (EAT)

Sahatavy is a town and commune (Malagasy: kaominina) in Madagascar. It belongs to the district of Vavatenina, which is a part of Analanjirofo Region in Toamasina Province.

The population of the commune was estimated to be approximately 16,334 inhabitants in 2018.

Primary and junior level secondary education are available in town. The majority 95% of the population of the commune are farmers. The most important crop is rice, while other important products are coffee and cloves. Services provide employment for 5% of the population.

== Rivers ==
It lies at the river with the same name: Sahatavy River.
