= Sandrakatsy =

- Location in Madagascar
- Coordinates: 16°20′S 49°37′E
- Country: Madagascar
- Region: Ambatosoa
- District: Mananara Nord
- Elevation: 229 m (751 ft)

Population (2001)
  - Total: 13,000
- Time zone: UTC+3 (EAT)
- Postal code: 511

Sandrakatsy is a rural municipality in Ambatosoa, Madagascar. It belongs to the district of Mananara Nord. The population of the commune was estimated to be approximately 13,000 in 2001 commune census.

Primary and junior level secondary education are available in town. The majority 80% of the population of the commune are farmers. The most important crop is cloves, while other important products are coffee, rice and vanilla. Services provide employment for 20% of the population.
