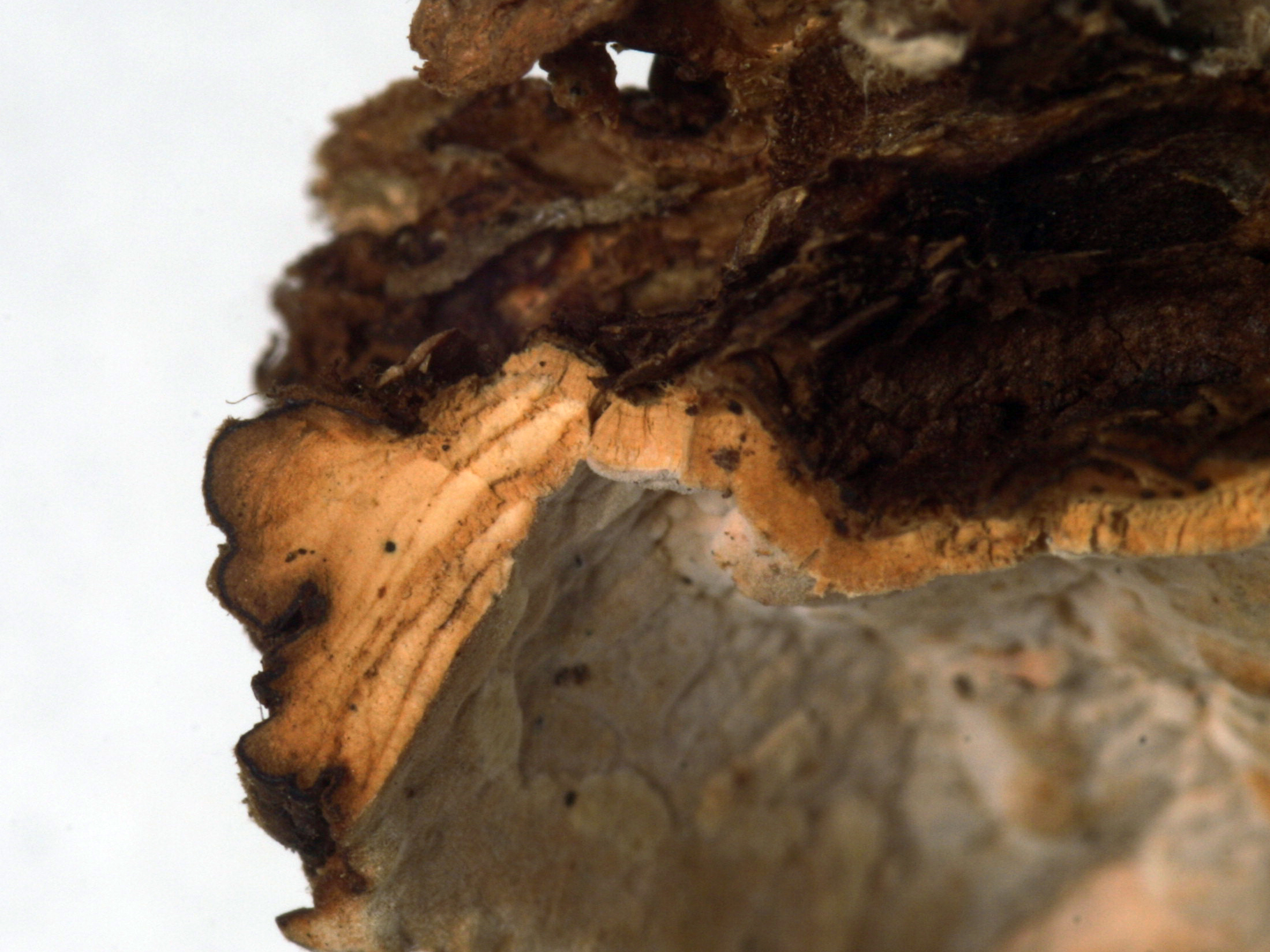

Scientific classification
- Domain: Eukaryota
- Kingdom: Fungi
- Division: Basidiomycota
- Class: Agaricomycetes
- Order: Russulales
- Family: Echinodontiaceae
- Genus: Laurilia
- Species: L. sulcata

Binomial name
- Laurilia sulcata (Burt) Pouzar

= Laurilia sulcata =

Species of fungus

Laurilia sulcata is a species of fungus belonging to the family Echinodontiaceae.

It is native to Eurasia and Northern America.
