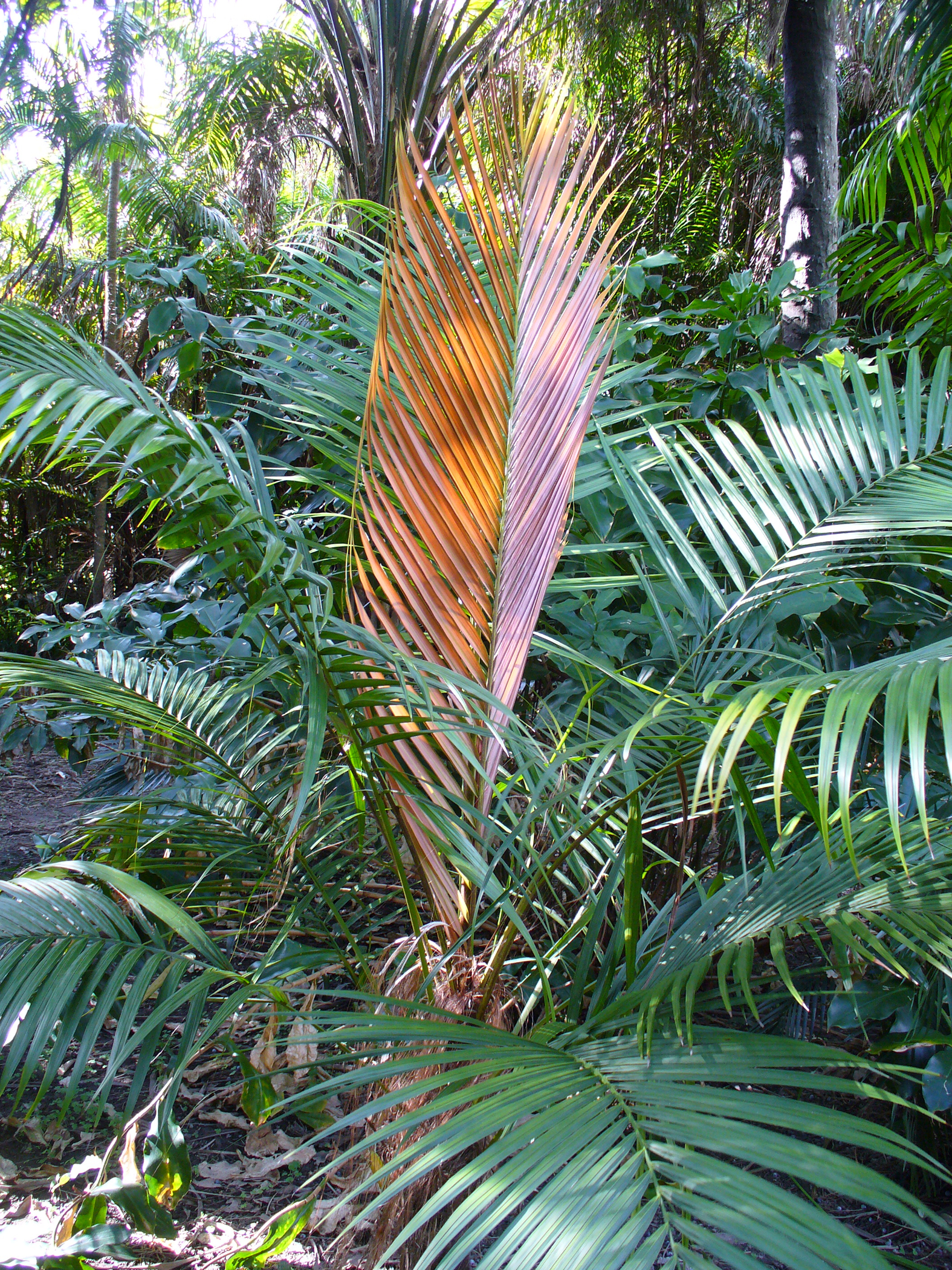

Conservation status
- Near Threatened (IUCN 3.1)

Scientific classification
- Kingdom: Plantae
- Clade: Embryophytes
- Clade: Tracheophytes
- Clade: Angiosperms
- Clade: Monocots
- Clade: Commelinids
- Order: Arecales
- Family: Arecaceae
- Genus: Vonitra
- Species: V. crinita

Binomial name
- Vonitra crinita (Jum. & H.Perrier

Synonyms
- Dypsis crinita (Jum. & H.Perrier) Beentje & J.Dransf.

= Vonitra crinita =

Species of flowering plant

Vonitra crinita, synonym Dypsis crinita, is a species of flowering plant in the family Arecaceae. It is found only in Madagascar. It is threatened by habitat loss.
