= Echinodontium ballouii =

Conservation status
- Endangered (IUCN 3.1)

Scientific classification
- Domain: Eukaryota
- Kingdom: Fungi
- Division: Basidiomycota
- Class: Agaricomycetes
- Order: Russulales
- Family: Echinodontiaceae
- Genus: Echinodontium
- Species: E. ballouii

Binomial name
- Echinodontium ballouii (Banker) H.L. Gross

Synonyms
- Steccherinium ballouii Banker

Echinodontium ballouii Mycological characteristics
- Pores on hymenium
- Cap is offset
- Ecology is parasitic
- Edibility is inedible

Echinodontium ballouii is a basidiomycete native to the northeastern United States. It is a polypore and important decomposer of the tree Chamaecyparis thyoides. It was declared an endangered species in 2015 due to the scarcity of this tree, which is threatened by the logging industry. It is probable that around 250 individuals exist today.

== Taxonomy ==
Echinodontium balloui initially was thought to be in the genus Steccherinum, as it had spines on its hymenium and no stipe. It was placed into the genus Echinodontium in 1964 by Henry Louis Gross, which was later confirmed by Manfred Binder through gene sequencing.

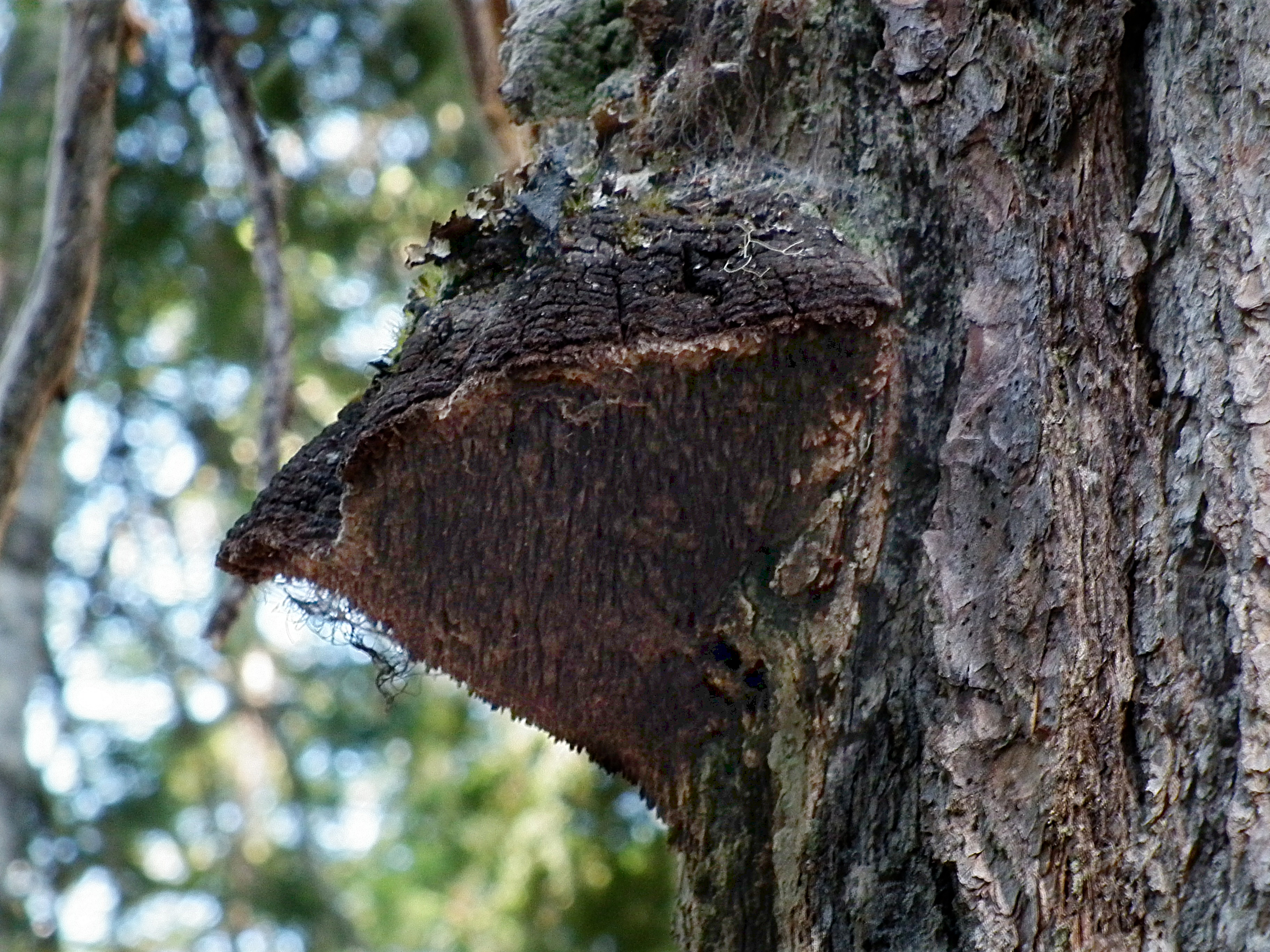
Echinodontium tinctorium, a close relative of Echinodontium ballouii

== Morphology ==
The fungi's fruiting bodies are irregularly-shaped shelf-like formations. Their diameters can span 5-50 centimeters, and they can grow up to 20 centimeters tall. They are brown in color, and the body is tough and woody. They are commonly seen with “teeth” or “spines” protruding from the cap's underside. As a polypore, the fungus's spores are released from an underside covered in small pores, which is lighter in color. These pores are conchate or bell-shaped and release the fungus's basidiospores.

The fungus's spores measure between 5-7 μm long and 2-3 μm tall and are strongly amyloid (turn blue-black under Melzer's reagent).As a polypore, Echinodontium ballouii is perennial, releasing spores once a year and forming a new layered hymenium directly on top of that of last year. The cystidia are 25-45 × 5-9 μm and club-shaped, becoming more thick-walled and dark with age. The basidia measure 20-25 × 6-8 μm and have 4 sterigma each.

The context (flesh) is made of skeletal and generative hyphae. The skeletal hyphae have a diameter of 3.5-4.5 μm, and are brown and smooth, with thick walls. The generative hyphae have a similar diameter and texture, but are transparent, thin-walled and nodose-septate.

== Ecology ==
Echinodontium ballouii is a hemi-biotrophic wood decomposer, feeding off of only a single species of tree: the Chamaecyparis thyoides Atlantic white cedar. The fungus forms complex mycelial networks inside the tree's trunk, slowly digesting cellulose and lignin, and emerging as fruiting bodies in order to reproduce. They are often found relatively high up on trees, below branching points.

== Habitat ==
Because this fungus only inhabits Chamaecyparis thyoides, its habitat is limited to this tree's ecological environment: swampy, coniferous forests within 150 miles of the Eastern coast of the United States. The production of fruiting bodies can take up to forty years, which means that the fungus is typically found on old growth trees.

== Geographic distribution ==
The fungus's limited host species results in a very confined geographical distribution. Only about twenty visibly occupied trees have been documented to date, each in the East coast of the United States, with the first sighted in New Jersey.

== Unique aspects ==
The small number of recorded Echinodontium ballouii has resulted in its classification as endangered. This is in part due to the formerly high demand for the fungi's host body, the Atlantic white cedar, for shipbuilding lumber, especially due to its coastal proximity. Today, demand for lumber still puts this important decomposer at risk. The fungus is named for William Hosea Ballou, one of its earliest discoverers. He mistakenly claimed that “there [was] no fungus more beautiful – or more deadly” to the Atlantic white cedar. In reality, the suffering trees that Ballou witnessed were likely due to logging development and changing hydrology. The fungus was generally thought to be extinct after no additional sightings occurred for the majority of the 20th century. However, it was rediscovered in the early 2000s by mycologists Larry Millman and Bill Neill.
