= Antanananivo =

Town in Mananara-Avaratra district, Madagascar

- Location in Madagascar
- Coordinates: 16°17′00″S 49°43′00″E
- Country: Madagascar
- Region: Ambatosoa
- District: Mananara-Avaratra
- Elevation: 129 m (423 ft)

Population (2018)
  - Total: 10,066
- Time zone: UTC3 (EAT)

Antanananivo is a town and commune (Malagasy: kaominina) in Ambatosoa, Madagascar. It belongs to the district of Mananara-Avaratra. The population of the commune was estimated to be approximately 10,066 in 2018.

== Agriculture ==
Cloves and vanilla is produced in Antanananivo.
