= Ambatoharanana, Mananara Nord =

Ambatoharanana
- Location in Madagascar
- Coordinates: 16°26′S 49°35′E
- Country: Madagascar
- Region: Ambatosoa
- District: Mananara Nord
- Elevation: 299 m (981 ft)

Population (2001)
  - Total: 9,000
- Time zone: UTC+3 (EAT)

For other places called Ambatoharanana, please see: Ambatoharanana (disambiguation)

Ambatoharanana is a town and commune (Malagasy: kaominina) in Ambatosoa, Madagascar. It belongs to the district of Mananara Nord. The population of the commune was estimated to be approximately 9,000 in 2001 commune census.

Only primary schooling is available. The majority 95% of the population of the commune are farmers. The most important crop is cloves, while other important products are coffee, rice and vanilla. Services provide employment for 5% of the population.
