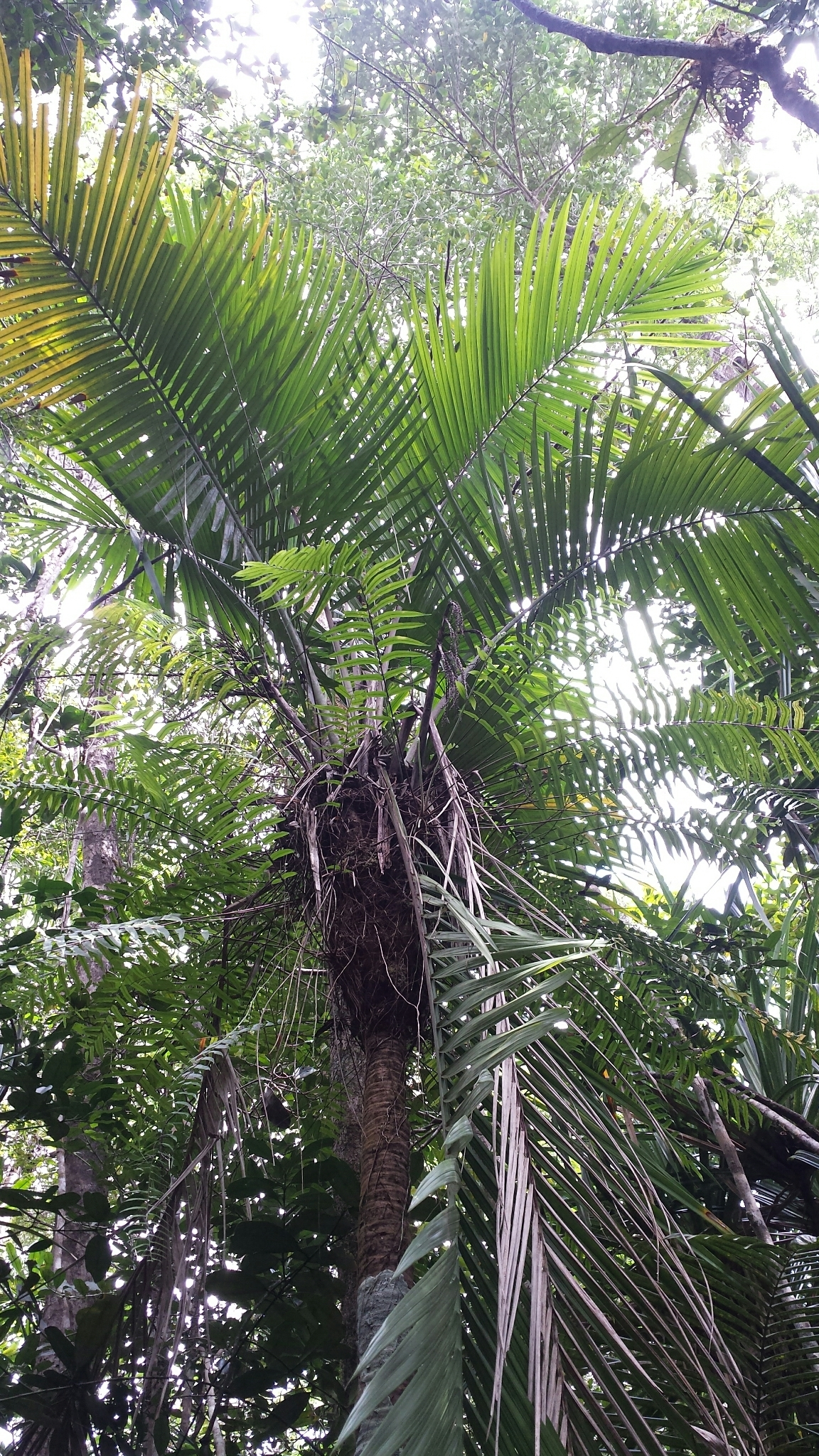

Conservation status
- Vulnerable (IUCN 3.1)

Scientific classification
- Kingdom: Plantae
- Clade: Embryophytes
- Clade: Tracheophytes
- Clade: Angiosperms
- Clade: Monocots
- Clade: Commelinids
- Order: Arecales
- Family: Arecaceae
- Genus: Vonitra
- Species: V. perrieri

Binomial name
- Vonitra perrieri (Jum.) Eiserhardt & W.J.Baker

Synonyms
- Antongilia perrieri Jum. Chrysalidocarpus auriculatus Jum. Chrysalidocarpus ruber Jum. Dypsis perrieri (Jum.) Beentje & J.Dransf.

= Vonitra perrieri =

Species of flowering plant

Vonitra perrieri, synonym Dypsis perrieri, is a species of flowering plant in the family Arecaceae. It is found only in Madagascar. It is threatened by habitat loss.
