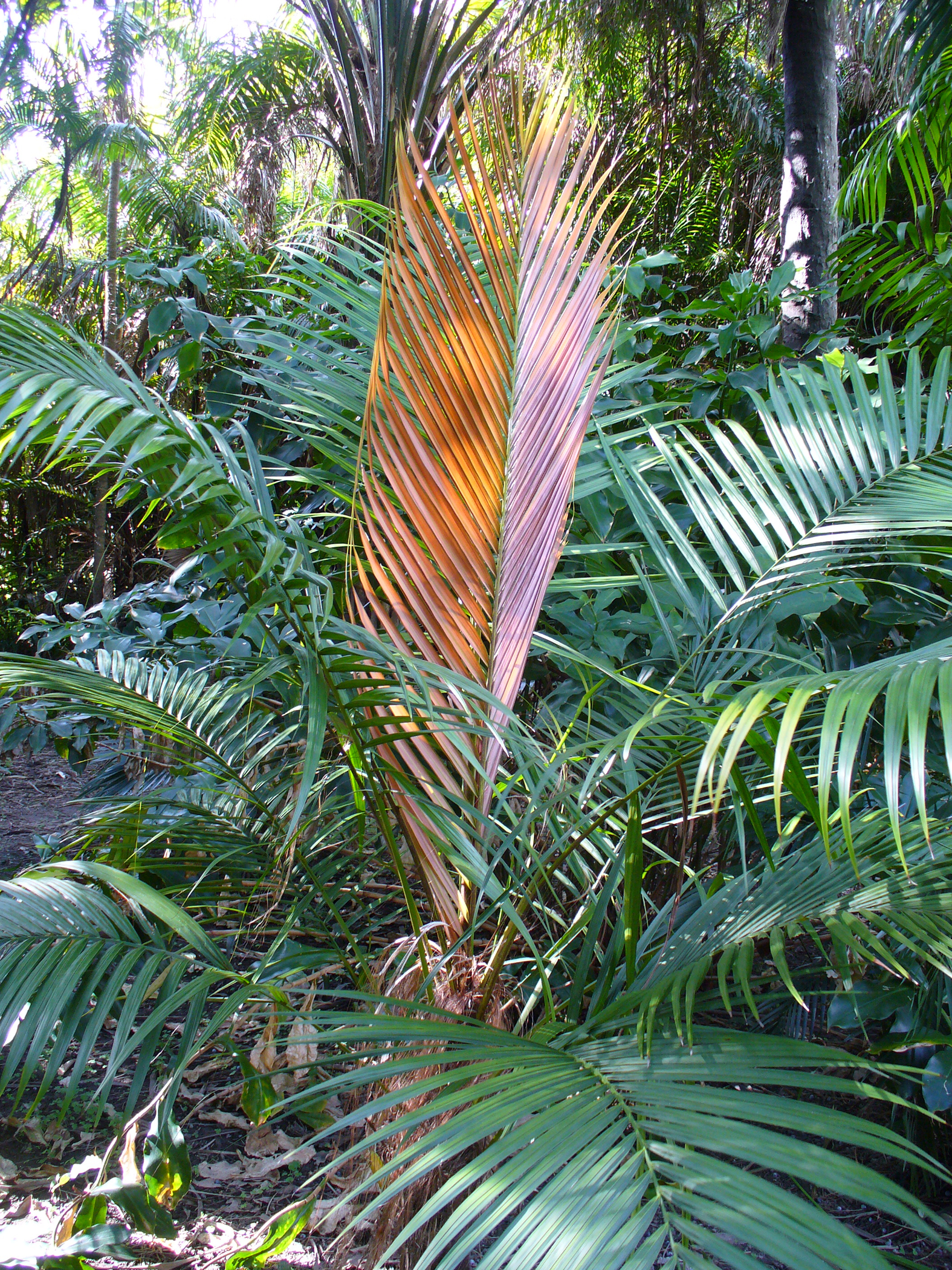
- Vonitra crinita

Scientific classification
- Kingdom: Plantae
- Clade: Tracheophytes
- Clade: Angiosperms
- Clade: Monocots
- Clade: Commelinids
- Order: Arecales
- Family: Arecaceae
- Subfamily: Arecoideae
- Tribe: Areceae
- Genus: Vonitra; Becc.

Type species
- Vonitra fibrosa (C.H.Wright) Becc.

Synonyms
- Antongilia Jum.

= Vonitra =

Genus of plants

Vonitra is a valid genus of African palms, family Arecaceae, first described by Odoardo Beccari in 1906. Species are endemic to Madagascar and were previously placed in the genus Dypsis. The type species is Vonitra fibrosa.

== Species ==
As of March 2026, Plants of the World Online accepts ten species:

- Vonitra antanambensis (Beentje) Eiserhardt & W.J.Baker
- Vonitra crinita Jum. & H.Perrier
- Vonitra dransfieldii (Beentje) Eiserhardt & W.J.Baker
- Vonitra fibrosa (C.H.Wright) Becc.
- Vonitra moorei (Beentje) Eiserhardt & W.J.Baker
- Vonitra nossibensis (Becc.) H.Perrier
- Vonitra perrieri (Jum.) Eiserhardt & W.J.Baker
- Vonitra pusilla (Beentje) Eiserhardt & W.J.Baker
- Vonitra utilis Jum.
- Vonitra vonitrandambo (Rakotoarin. & J.Dransf.) Eiserhardt & W.J.Baker
