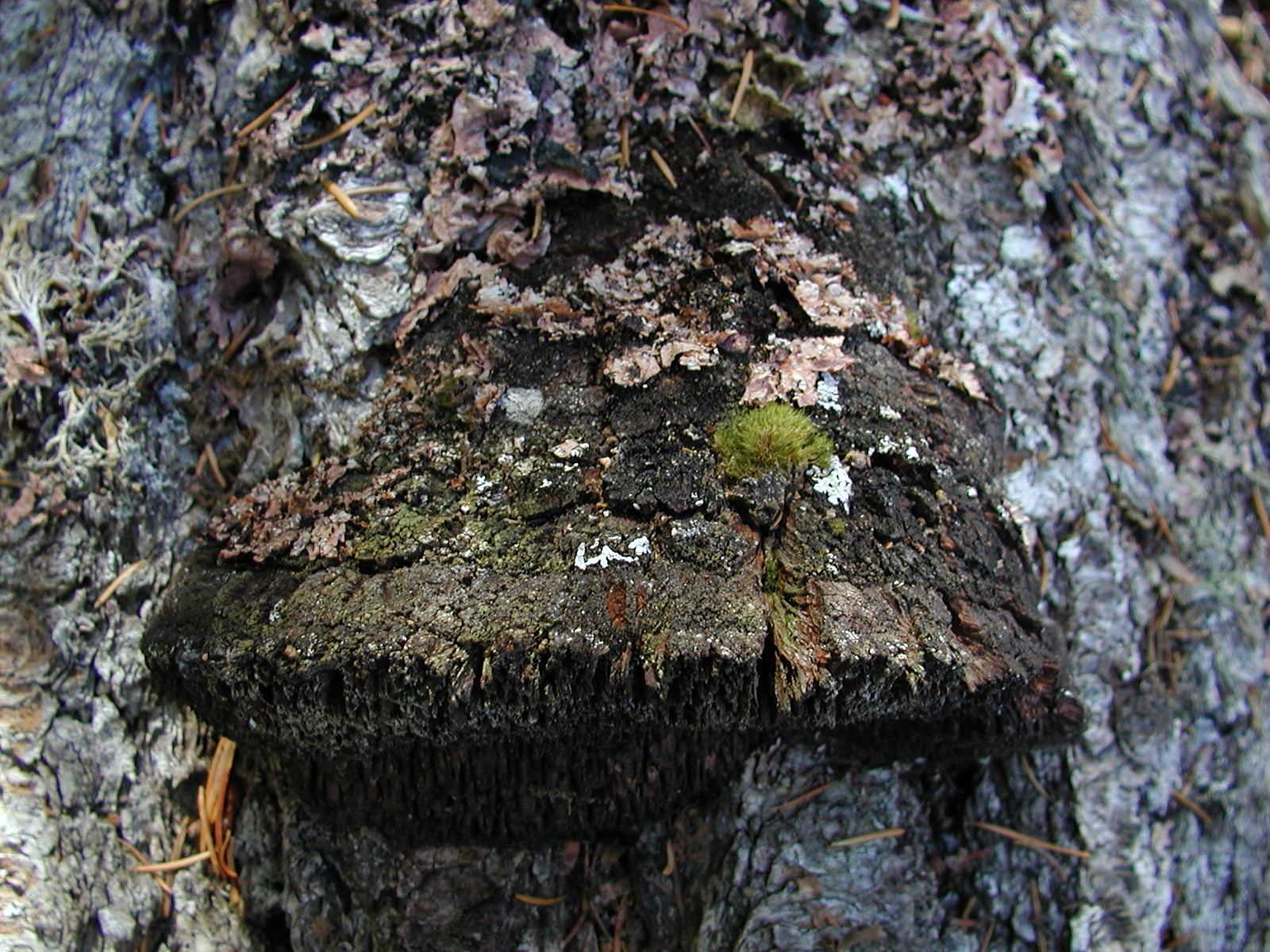
- Echinodontium tinctorium

Scientific classification
- Kingdom: Fungi
- Division: Basidiomycota
- Class: Agaricomycetes
- Order: Russulales
- Family: Echinodontiaceae
- Genus: Echinodontium; Ellis & Everh. (1900)

Type species
- Echinodontium tinctorium (Ellis & Everh.) Ellis & Everh. (1900)

Synonyms
- Hydnofomes Henn. (1900); Hydnophysa Clem. (1909)

= Echinodontium =

Genus of fungi

Echinodontium is a genus of fungi in the family Echinodontiaceae. The genus was published by American mycologist Job Bicknell Ellis in 1900, who described it thus: "Differs from Hydnum in the thick, woody pileus of Fomes and the teeth beset with spines, as in Mucronophorus and Hymenochaete". The type species, Echinodontium tinctorium, is commonly known as the "indian paint fungus" owing to its traditional use for bodypainting.

== Species ==
- Echinodontium ballouii (Banker) H.L.Gross (1964) – New Jersey (USA)
- Echinodontium japonicum Imazeki (1935) – Japan
- Echinodontium ryvardenii Bernicchia & Piga (1998) – Italy
- Echinodontium tinctorium (Ellis & Everh.) Ellis & Everh. (1900) – western North America
- Echinodontium tsugicola (Henn. & Shirai) Imazeki (1935) – Japan
