= Ampasimazava, Vavatenina =

Ampasimazava
- Location in Madagascar
- Coordinates: 17°40′S 49°8′E
- Country: Madagascar
- Region: Analanjirofo
- District: Vavatenina
- Elevation: 293 m (961 ft)

Population (2001)
  - Total: 10,000
- Time zone: UTC3 (EAT)

Ampasimazava is a town and commune (Malagasy: kaominina) in Madagascar. It belongs to the district of Vavatenina, which is a part of Analanjirofo Region. The population of the commune was estimated to be approximately 10,000 in 2001 commune census.

Only primary schooling is available. The majority 80% of the population of the commune are farmers, while an additional 5% receives their livelihood from raising livestock. The most important crop is rice, while other important products are cloves and lychee. Services provide employment for 15% of the population.
