= Saromaona =

- Location in Madagascar
- Coordinates: 16°9′S 49°19′E
- Country: Madagascar
- Region: Ambatosoa
- District: Mananara Nord
- Elevation: 669 m (2,195 ft)

Population (2001)
  - Total: 5,000
- Time zone: UTC+3 (EAT)

Saromaona is a town and commune (Malagasy: kaominina) in Ambatosoa, Madagascar. It belongs to the district of Mananara Nord. The population of the commune was estimated to be approximately 5,000 in 2001 commune census.

Only primary schooling is available. The majority 97% of the population of the commune are farmers. The most important crops are rice and cloves, while other important agricultural products are coffee and vanilla. Services provide employment for 3% of the population.
