= Mananara Nord Airport =

Airport in Madagascar

- IATA: WMR; ICAO: FMNC

Summary
- Airport type: Public
- Operator: ADEMA (Aéroports de Madagascar)
- Serves: Mananara Nord
- Location: Ambatosoa, Madagascar
- Elevation AMSL: 9 ft / 3 m
- Coordinates: 16°09′50″S 49°46′25″E

Map
- Location within Madagascar

Runways
Direction	Length		Surface
Direction	ft	m	Surface
11/29	4,101	1,250	Asphalt
- DAFIF

Mananara Nord Airport is an airport in Mananara Nord, Ambatosoa, Madagascar (IATA: WMR, ICAO: FMNC).
