= Vonitra nossibensis =

Conservation status
- Critically Endangered (IUCN 3.1)

Scientific classification
- Kingdom: Plantae
- Clade: Embryophytes
- Clade: Tracheophytes
- Clade: Angiosperms
- Clade: Monocots
- Clade: Commelinids
- Order: Arecales
- Family: Arecaceae
- Genus: Vonitra
- Species: V. nossibensis

Binomial name
- Vonitra nossibensis (Becc.) H.Perrier

Synonyms
- Chrysalidocarpus nossibensis Becc.; Dypsis nossibensis (Becc.) Beentje & J.Dransf.; Haplophloga loucoubensis Baill.; Vonitra loucoubensis (Baill.) Jum.

Species of flowering plant

Vonitra nossibensis, synonym Dypsis nossibensis, is a species of flowering plant in the family Arecaceae. It is found only in the Lokobe Forest in north-west Madagascar and is threatened by habitat loss. Fewer than 25 trees have been counted.
