= Vonitra dransfieldii =

Conservation status
- Near Threatened (IUCN 3.1)

Scientific classification
- Kingdom: Plantae
- Clade: Embryophytes
- Clade: Tracheophytes
- Clade: Angiosperms
- Clade: Monocots
- Clade: Commelinids
- Order: Arecales
- Family: Arecaceae
- Genus: Vonitra
- Species: V. dransfieldii

Binomial name
- Vonitra dransfieldii (Beentje) Eiserhardt & W.J.Baker

Synonyms
- Dypsis dransfieldii Beentje

Species of flowering plant

Vonitra dransfieldii, synonym Dypsis dransfieldii, is a species of flowering plant in the Arecaceae family. It is a palm endemic to Madagascar that grows on white sands in lowland forest habitat. Populations are protected in Masoala National Park.
