= Tanibe =

- Location in Madagascar
- Coordinates: 16°24′S 49°25′E
- Country: Madagascar
- Region: Ambatosoa
- District: Mananara Nord
- Elevation: 571 m (1,873 ft)

Population (2001)
  - Total: 10,000
- Time zone: UTC+3 (EAT)

Tanibe is a town and commune (Malagasy: kaominina) in Ambatosoa, Madagascar. It belongs to the district of Mananara Nord. The population of the commune was estimated to be approximately 10,000 in 2001 commune census.

Only primary schooling is available. The majority 97% of the population of the commune are farmers. The most important crop is cloves, while other important products are coffee and rice. Services provide employment for 3% of the population.
