= Umushamyces =

Scientific classification
- Kingdom: Fungi
- Division: Ascomycota
- Class: Lecanoromycetes
- Order: Lecanorales
- Family: Scoliciosporaceae
- Genus: Umushamyces; Etayo (2008)
- Species: U. kuturnus

Binomial name
- Umushamyces kuturnus Etayo (2008)

Fungal genus

Umushamyces is a genus in the family Scoliciosporaceae. It is monotypic, containing the single lichenicolous fungus species Umushamyces kuturnus. Both the genus and species were described as new to science in 2008 by lichenologist Javier Etayo. The genus is similar in appearance to Arthonia, but with Biatora or Bacidia-type asci. The species was found parasitising the lichen Coccotrema cucurbitula.
