= Erythrosine =

Iodo-derivative of fluorone used as a pink dye

- Erythrosine

Names
- IUPAC name 2-(6-Hydroxy-2,4,5,7-tetraiodo-3-oxo-xanthen-9-yl)benzoic acid

Identifiers
CAS Number	16423-68-0
3D model (JSmol)	Interactive image
ChEMBL	ChEMBL1332616
ChemSpider	3144
ECHA InfoCard	100.036.390
E number	E127 (colours)
PubChem CID	3259
UNII	8TL7LH93FM
CompTox Dashboard (EPA)	DTXSID7044843
- InChI: InChI=1S/C20H8I4O5/c21-11-5-9-17(13(23)15(11)25)28-18-10(6-12(22)16(26)14(18)24)20(9)8-4-2-1-3-7(8)19(27)29-20/h1-6,25-26H Key: OALHHIHQOFIMEF-UHFFFAOYSA-N; InChI=1/C20H8I4O5/c21-11-5-9-17(13(23)15(11)25)28-18-10(6-12(22)16(26)14(18)24)20(9)8-4-2-1-3-7(8)19(27)29-20/h1-6,25-26H Key: OALHHIHQOFIMEF-UHFFFAOYAB
- SMILES: [O-]C(=O)C1=CC=CC=C1C1=C2C=C(I)C(=O)C(I)=C2OC2=C1C=C(I)C([O-])=C2I.[Na+].[Na+]

Properties
Chemical formula	C_{20}H_{6}I_{4}Na_{2}O_{5}
Molar mass	879.86 g/mol
Melting point	142 to 144 °C (288 to 291 °F; 415 to 417 K)

Hazards
NFPA 704 (fire diamond)	2 1 0
- Except where otherwise noted, data are given for materials in their standard state (at 25 °C [77 °F], 100 kPa). verify (what is ?) Infobox references

Erythrosine, also known as E127, FD&C Red 3 and Red No. 3, is an organoiodine compound, specifically a derivative of fluorone. It is a red-pink dye used for food coloring, cosmetics, hair coloring, pet products, and diverse industrial colorings. It is the disodium salt of 2,4,5,7-tetraiodofluorescein.

== History ==
The colorant was discovered by the Swiss chemist Karl Kussmaul at the University of Basel in 1876 and soon commercialized by the local Bindschedler & Busch company for dyeing wool and silk. Its use as a textile dye was soon superseded due to its propensity to fade in sunlight.

Its use as a food dye was legalized in the US by the Pure Food and Drug Act of 1906. By early 1920s, it was produced mainly for the food industry, with 2,170 pounds (0.98 t) made in America in 1924, rising to 9,468 pounds (4.29 t) in 1938 and approximately 50 tons in 1967.

== Production ==
Erythrosine is synthesized from resorcinol and phthalic anhydride, which are processed into fluorescein. Fluorescein then undergoes iodination, producing the bright red dye.

== Uses ==
It is used as a food coloring, printing ink, biological stain, dental plaque disclosing agent, radiopaque medium, sensitizer for orthochromatic photographic films, and visible light photoredox catalyst.

Erythrosine is commonly used in sweets, such as some candies, ice pops and cherries, and in cake-decorating gels. It was also used to color pistachio shells. As a food additive, it has the E number E127 in Europe. It is not approved by the FDA in the US.

== Safety assessment and regulation ==
Laboratory studies in the late 20th century suggested that "chronic erythrosine ingestion may promote thyroid tumor formation in rats via chronic stimulation of the thyroid by TSH" at concentrations of 4% erythrosine. Toxicology tests combined with a review of other reported studies concluded that erythrosine is non-genotoxic and any tumor growth results from a non-genotoxic mechanism.

In the United States, laboratory evidence of carcinogenicity of extremely high doses of erythrosine renders it as "unsafe" under federal law by a provision called the Delaney Clause, despite conclusions by the federal Center for Food Safety and Applied Nutrition and Cancer Assessment Committee that the risk of developing cancer in humans is unlikely at the low erythrosine levels consumed as a food color.

Throughout the early 21st century, the World Health Organization and several national food safety agencies permitted use of erythrosine as a color additive when used in amounts below acceptable daily intake levels for certain foods, such as for packaged cherries; countries having restricted-use provisions were the European Union, United States, Canada, and Australia/New Zealand.

Since 1994, the European Food Safety Authority has only allowed erythrosine in processed cherries, pet foods, and up to 25 ppm in toothpaste. In the United Kingdom, it is also allowed for coloring eggshells. It may not be sold directly to consumers.

In the United States, the use of erythrosine in cosmetics, topical drugs, some foods, and in all uses as its lake variant have been banned by the Food and Drug Administration (FDA) since 1990. In January 2025, the FDA banned the use of erythrosine in all foods and ingested drugs, with enforcement beginning on 15 January 2027 and 18 January 2028, respectively. An October 2023 bill passed in the state of California also banned the use of erythrosine in foods (along with brominated vegetable oil, potassium bromate, and propylparaben), with enforcement beginning on 1 January 2027.

In 2025, Health Canada stated that erythrosine "does not pose a health risk to the general Canadian population at the levels set out in the List of Permitted Food Colours."

== Synonyms ==
Erythrosine B; Erythrosin B; Acid Red 51; C.I. 45430; FD&C Red No. 3; E127; 2',4',5',7'-Tetraiodo-3',6'-dihydroxy-spiro[3H-isobenzofuran-1,9'-xanthen]-3-one disodium salt; Tetraiodofluorescein sodium salt; Calcoid Erythrosine N; 2,4,5,7-Tetraiodo-3,6-dihydroxyxanthene-9-spiro-1'-3H-isobenzofuran-3'-one disodium salt; 2',4',5',7'-Tetraiodofluorescein, disodium salt; C.I. Food Red 14; Aizen Erythrosine; Tetraiodifluorescein, disodium salt; Spiro[isobenzofuran- 1(3H),9'-[9H]xanthen]-3-one, 3',6'-dihydroxy-2',4',5',7'-tetraiodo-, disodium salt.

== Classification ==
It is listed under the following number systems:

- FD&C Red No. 3
- E number E127 (Food Red 14)
- Colour Index no. 45430 (Acid Red 51)
- Bureau of Indian Standards No. 1697
