= Ambodimangavalo =

- Location in Madagascar
- Coordinates: 17°31′S 48°57′E
- Country: Madagascar
- Region: Analanjirofo
- District: Vavatenina
- Elevation: 549 m (1,801 ft)

Population (2001)
  - Total: 11,000
- Time zone: UTC3 (EAT)

Ambodimangavalo is a town and commune (Malagasy: kaominina) in Madagascar. It belongs to the district of Vavatenina, which is a part of the Analanjirofo Region. The population of the commune was estimated to be approximately 11,000 in the 2001 census.

Only primary schooling is available. The vast majority (98%) of the commune's population are farmers. The most important crops are coffee and cloves. Rice is also an important agricultural product. The service sector provides employment for 2% of the population.
