= Vonitra antanambensis =

Conservation status
- Critically Endangered (IUCN 3.1)

Scientific classification
- Kingdom: Plantae
- Clade: Tracheophytes
- Clade: Angiosperms
- Clade: Monocots
- Clade: Commelinids
- Order: Arecales
- Family: Arecaceae
- Genus: Vonitra
- Species: V. antanambensis

Binomial name
- Vonitra antanambensis (Beentje) Eiserhardt & W.J.Baker (2022)

Synonyms
- Dypsis antanambensis Beentje

Species of palm tree

Vonitra antanambensis, synonym Dypsis antanambensis, is a species of flowering plant in the Arecaceae family. It is a palm endemic to Madagascar, where it grows in rainforests. The whole population occurs within Mananara-Nord National Park and there are fewer than 50 mature individuals estimated to remain.
