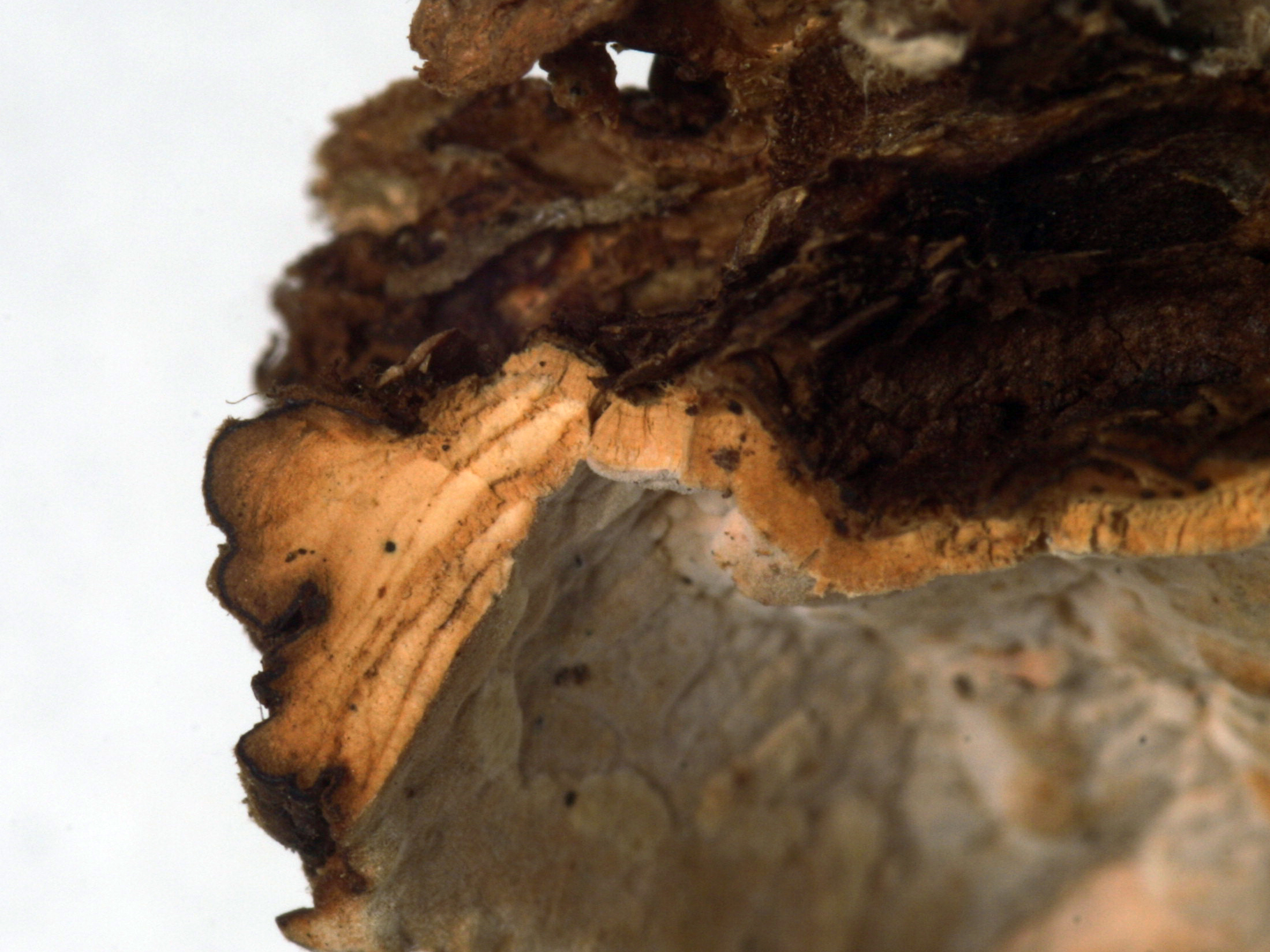

Scientific classification
- Kingdom: Fungi
- Division: Basidiomycota
- Class: Agaricomycetes
- Order: Russulales
- Family: Echinodontiaceae
- Genus: Laurilia; Pouzar (1959)

Type species
- Laurilia sulcata (Burt) Pouzar (1959)

= Laurilia =

Genus of fungi

Laurilia is a monotypic genus of crust fungi in the family Echinodontiaceae. The genus was described in 1959 by Czech mycologist Zdeněk Pouzar, with Laurilia sulcata (originally Stereum sulcatum) as the type and only species. Pouzar then transferred Laurilia taxodii from Stereum to Laurilia in 1968, but Liu et al. erected the new genus Lauriliella for the latter species in 2017 on the basis of ribosomal DNA molecular phylogeny. Liu et al. also found the Echinodontiaceae as traditionally circumscribed to be paraphyletic and placed Laurilia and Lauriliella instead in the Bondarzewiaceae, though this placement is not yet reflected in taxonomic authorities such as the Index Fungorum.

The generic name honors Finnish mycologist Matti Laurila (1915–1942), for his contributions to the knowledge of northern European resupinate fungi.

== Species ==
- Laurilia sulcata (Burt) Pouzar (1959)
