= Tanamarina, Vavatenina =

Tanamarina
- Location in Madagascar
- Coordinates: 18°01′S 49°12′E
- Country: Madagascar
- Region: Analanjirofo
- District: Vavatenina
- Elevation: 125 m (410 ft)

Population (2018)
  - Total: 8,564
- Time zone: UTC3 (EAT)

Tanamarina is a commune in Madagascar. It belongs to the district of Vavatenina, which is a part of Analanjirofo Region. The population of the commune was 8,564 in 2018.

In addition to primary schooling the town offers secondary education at both junior and senior levels. The town provides access to hospital services to its citizens. The majority 90% of the population of the commune are farmers. The most important crop is cloves, while other important products are coffee and rice. Services provide employment for 10% of the population.
