= Sahatavy River =

River in eastern Madagascar

The Sahatavy is a river of eastern Madagascar. It flows through Zahamena National Park. The town of Sahatavy lies on the bank. The Sarondrina River is a tributary of the Sahatavy.
