= Vanono =

- Location in Madagascar
- Coordinates: 16°2′S 49°27′E
- Country: Madagascar
- Region: Ambatosoa
- District: Mananara Nord
- Elevation: 345 m (1,132 ft)

Population (2001)
  - Total: 14,000
- Time zone: UTC+3 (EAT)

Vanono is a town and commune (Malagasy: kaominina) in Ambatosoa, Madagascar. It belongs to the district of Mananara Nord. The population of the commune was estimated to be approximately 14,000 in 2001 commune census.

Only primary schooling is available. The majority 98% of the population of the commune are farmers. The most important crops are rice and vanilla; also cloves is an important agricultural product. Services provide employment for 2% of the population.
