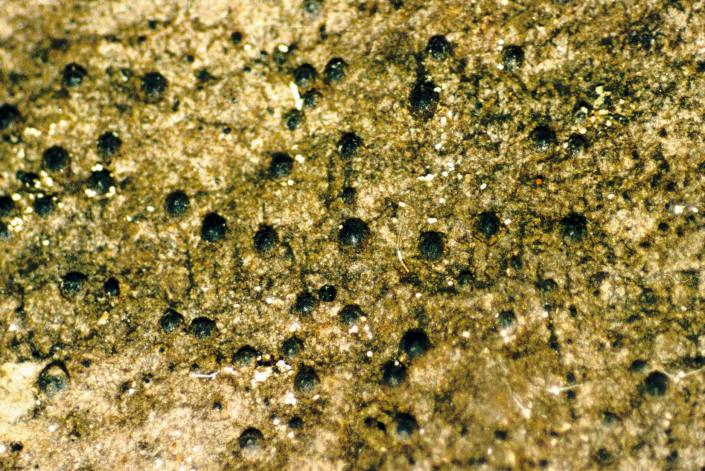
- Herbarium specimen of Scoliciosporum chlorococcum growing on the bark of a red maple

Scientific classification
- Kingdom: Fungi
- Division: Ascomycota
- Class: Lecanoromycetes
- Order: Lecanorales
- Family: Scoliciosporaceae
- Genus: Scoliciosporum; A.Massal. (1852)

Type species
- Scoliciosporum holomelaeum (Flörke) A.Massal. (1852)

Synonyms
- Scalidium Hellb. (1867); Scolecosporis Clem. (1909); Scoliciosporomyces Cif. & Tomas. (1953); Lilliputeana Sérus. (1989)

= Scoliciosporum =

Genus of lichens

Scoliciosporum is a genus of lichens in the family Scoliciosporaceae.

== Taxonomy ==
The genus was reinstated by Antonin Vězda in 1978 to contain crustose lichens with immarginate apothecia, gelatinized, branched, and anastomosing paraphyses, eight-spored, usually Lecanora-type asci, and hyaline, multi-septate ascospores.

Scoliciosporum was originally placed in the family Micareaceae by Josef Poelt in 1974. This classification was rejected after the appearance of molecular phylogenetic studies in the mid-2000s.

== Habitat and distribution ==
Scoliciosporum species grow mainly on bark, stones and leaves. They occur mostly in temperate locales.

== Species ==
- Scoliciosporum abietinum T.Sprib. (2009)
- Scoliciosporum arachnoideum Aptroot (2008) – Madagascar
- Scoliciosporum camptosporum (Vain.) Aptroot (2002)
- Scoliciosporum chlorococcum (Graewe ex Stenh.) Vězda (1978)
- Scoliciosporum coniectum Kantvilas & Lumbsch (2010)
- Scoliciosporum curvatum Sérus. (1993)
- Scoliciosporum fabisporum Fryday & I.Medeiros (2020) – South Africa
- Scoliciosporum holomelaenum (Flörke) A.Massal. (1852)
- Scoliciosporum intrusum (Th.Fr.) Hafellner (2004)
- Scoliciosporum jasonhurii S.Y.Kondr., S.O.Oh & Lőkös (2016)
- Scoliciosporum pensylvanicum R.C.Harris (2009)
- Scoliciosporum pruinosum (P.James) Vězda (1978)
- Scoliciosporum sarothamni (Vain.) Vězda (1978)
- Scoliciosporum umbrinum (Ach.) Lojka (1869)
- Scoliciosporum vouauxii (B.de Lesd.) Hafellner (2002)
