= Mahanoro, Mananara Nord =

Mahanoro
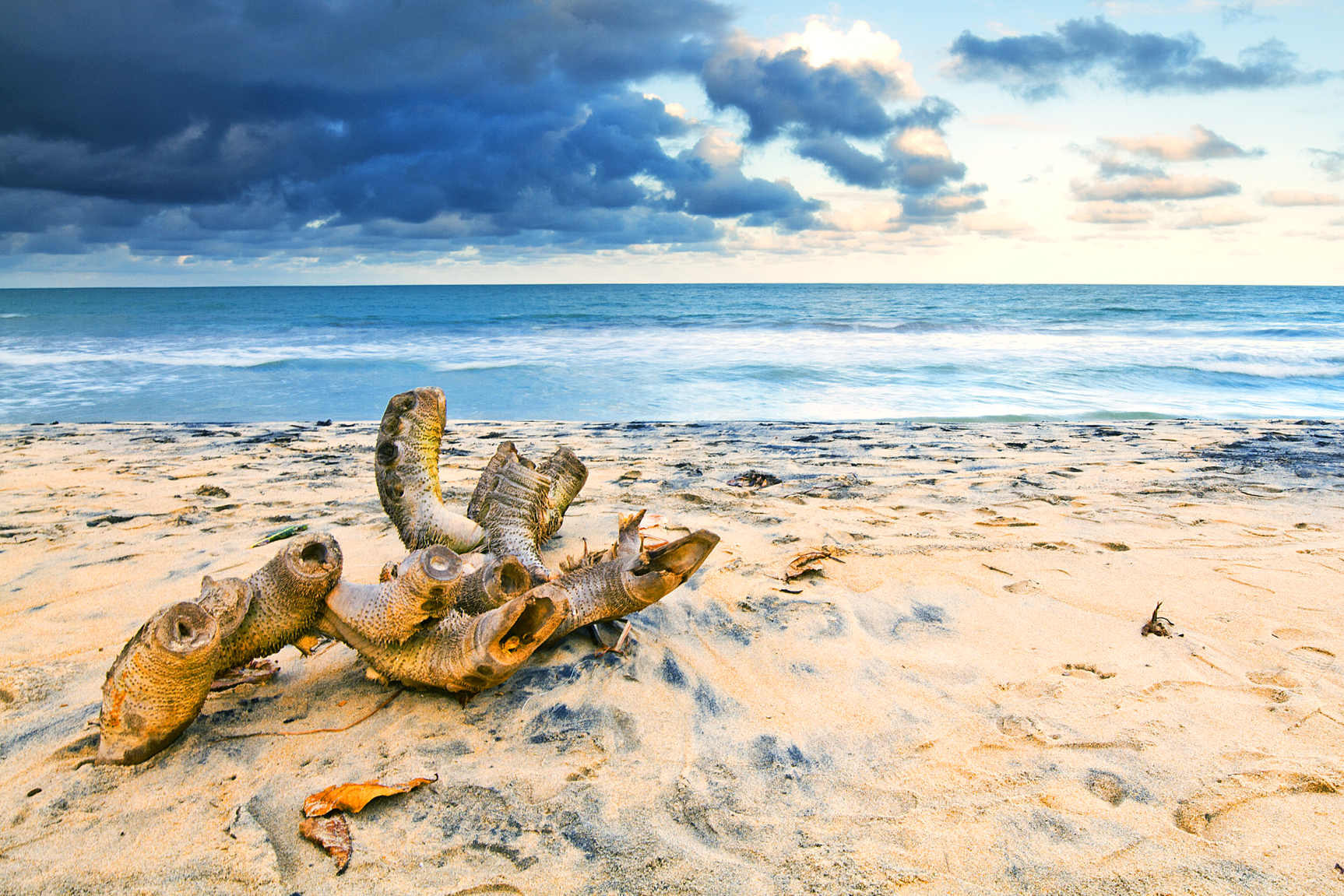
- Beach at Mahanoro

- Location in Madagascar
- Coordinates: 16°02′S 49°22′E
- Country: Madagascar
- Region: Ambatosoa
- District: Mananara Nord
- Elevation: 395 m (1,296 ft)

Population (2018)
  - Total: 8,117
- Time zone: UTC+3 (EAT)

Mahanoro is a commune (Malagasy: kaominina) in Ambatosoa, Madagascar. It belongs to the district of Mananara Nord. The population of the commune was estimated to be approximately 8,117 in 2018.

== Agriculture ==
Cloves and vanilla are produced in Mahanoro.
