= Antanambe =

- Location in Madagascar
- Coordinates: 16°26′S 49°51′E
- Country: Madagascar
- Region: Ambatosoa
- District: Mananara Nord
- Elevation: 14 m (46 ft)

Population (2001)
  - Total: 18,000
- Time zone: UTC3 (EAT)

Antanambe is a town and commune (Malagasy: kaominina) in Ambatosoa, Madagascar. It belongs to the district of Mananara Nord. The population of the commune was estimated to be approximately 18,000 in 2001 commune census.

Primary and junior level secondary education are available in town. The majority 85% of the population of the commune are farmers. The most important crops are rice and vanilla; also cloves are an important agricultural product. Services provide employment for 10% of the population. Additionally fishing employs 5% of the population.
