= Andasibe =

- Location in Madagascar
- Coordinates: 16°15′00″S 49°46′48″E
- Country: Madagascar
- Region: Ambatosoa
- District: Mananara Nord
- Elevation: 129 m (423 ft)

Population (2018)
  - Total: 7,960
- Time zone: UTC+3 (EAT)

Andasibe is a town and commune (Malagasy: kaominina) in Ambatosoa, Madagascar. It belongs to the district of Mananara Nord. The population of the commune was estimated to be approximately 7,960 in 2018.

== Agriculture ==
Cloves and vanilla are produced in Andasibe.

Much of the area consists of rice paddies.

== Lemurs ==
The area around Andasibe is a habitat comprising the Andasibe-Mantadia National Park, which contains several species of lemurs, including the Indri, Goodman's mouse lemur, and the diademed sifaka.
