= Antanambe, Diana =

Antanambe
- Location in Madagascar
- Coordinates: 13°42′S 48°22′E
- Country: Madagascar
- Region: Diana
- District: Ambilobe
- Elevation: 20 m (66 ft)

Population (2018)Census
  - Total: 8,187
- Time zone: UTC3 (EAT)
- Postal code: 204

Antanambe is a municipality in Madagascar. It belongs to the district of Ambilobe, which is a part of Diana Region.
