= Mananara-Nord National Park =

National park in Madagascar

Mananara Nord National Park
- Location within Madagascar
- Location: Northeastern Madagascar
- Nearest city: Mananara Nord - Toamasina
- Coordinates: 16°10′S 49°45′E
- Area: 24 000 ha (92.6 square miles)
- Governing body: Madagascar National Parks Association

Mananara Nord National Park is a national park near Mananara Nord in the Ambatosoa region of Madagascar.

The park is bounded by the Mananara river to the north, the Sandrakatsy river and Fotsialanana river to the west, the Anove river to the south and the Indian Ocean to the east. The closest city is Toamasina.

It also includes a marine park of 1000 ha near the village Sahasoa, with 3 islands, 3.5 km off Sahasoa: Nosy Antafana, Nosy Hely and Nosy Rangontsy. On Nosy Antafana there is a campground near the springs.

Particular species:

- Dypsis antanambensis, an endemic, threatened palm tree.
- Voanioala gerardii, a rare coconut
- Allocebus trichotis, a lemur only found near the Mananara river.
