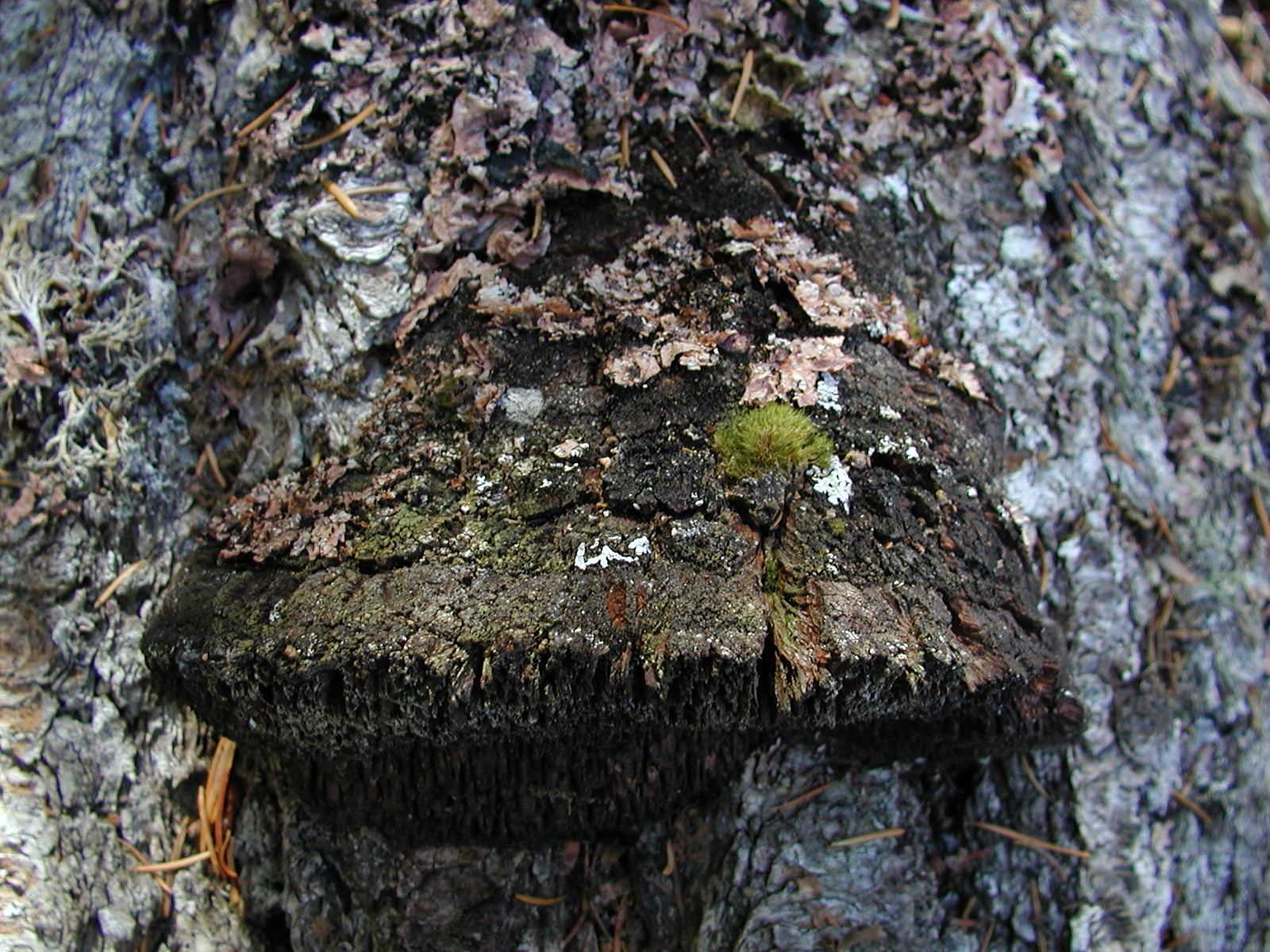
- Echinodontium tinctorium

Scientific classification
- Kingdom: Fungi
- Division: Basidiomycota
- Class: Agaricomycetes
- Order: Russulales
- Family: Echinodontiaceae; Donk (1961)

Type genus
- Echinodontium Ellis & Everh. (1900)

Genera
- Echinodontium; Laurilia

= Echinodontiaceae =

Family of fungi

The Echinodontiaceae are a family of crust fungi in the order Russulales. Species of this family, divided amongst two genera—Echinodontium and Laurilia—have a widespread distribution, although they are especially predominant in north temperate zones. They are parasitic or saprobic on wood, and may cause white rot of angiosperms and gymnosperms.

== Description ==
Species of this family have resupinate to effused-reflexed basidiocarps, smooth to spiny hymenophores, amyloid spores, dimitic hyphae, and cause white rot.

== Classification ==
The family was circumscribed by Marinus Anton Donk in 1961, and monographed by Henry L. Gross in 1964. He recognized six species in the genus Echinodontium (E. tinctorium, E. tsugicola, E. ballouii, E. japonicum, E. taxodii and E. sulcatum) with hymenia ranging from smooth to spiny. Walter Jülich added another genus Laurilia (incorporating E. taxodii and E. sulcatum) when he described the family in 1981. Molecular phylogenetic studies show that the Echinodontiaceae belong in the Russuloid clade. Although some studies have suggested that the genus Echinodontium is closely related to Amylostereum, a more recent study does not support this conclusion.

== Genera ==
Species in the genus Echinodontium have a hydnaceous (with spinelike protuberances) hymenial surface, dimitic hyphal system, smooth basidiospores, and in three of four species, a symbiotic association with horntails — Sirex and Urocerus species. The insects eat the fungus and help disperse the species by inoculating the wood of the host tree with either hyphal fragments or spores when they lay their eggs.

The genus Laurilia has species characterized by an even to tuberculate hymenial surface, dimitic hyphal system, and echinulate basidiospores.

In his monograph on the Echinodontiaceae, Gross (1964) suggested that Echinodontium and Laurilia were congeneric (sharing the same taxonomic genus), sharing features such as clamp connections, thick-walled encrusted cystidia and a brown context. Later molecular data have supported this early hypothesis.

== Notable species ==
The species Echinodontium tinctorium causes a destructive tree disease called "true heart rot", meaning the decay is confined to the heartwood of the tree. The specific epithet tinctorium makes reference to the usage of fruit bodies (commonly known as the "indian paint fungus") by Native Americans to prepare red pigments. One of the pigments in this species, named echinotinctone (2,6-dihydroxy-1,8-dimethyl-3H-xanthen-3-one), is the first simple fluorone pigment from fungi. Another species, E. ballouii, known only from two collections on Atlantic white cedar, has not been found since 1909, coinciding with a reduction in the range of this tree due to harvesting.

Echinodontium ryvardenii is a species found only on Juniper plants in Corsica. The illudane sesquiterpenoids echinolactones A and B have been isolated from the culture broth of E. japonicum. A number of triterpenoids have also been identified in E. tsugicola.
