= Ambodiampana, Mananara Nord =

Ambodiampana
- Location in Madagascar
- Coordinates: 16°6′S 49°37′E
- Country: Madagascar
- Region: Ambatosoa
- District: Mananara Nord
- Elevation: 68 m (223 ft)

Population (2001)
  - Total: 8,000
- Time zone: UTC+3 (EAT)

Ambodiampana is a town and commune (Malagasy: kaominina) in Ambatosoa, Madagascar. It belongs to the district of Mananara Nord. The population of the commune was estimated to be approximately 8,000 in 2001 commune census.

Primary and junior level secondary education are available in town. The majority 95% of the population of the commune are farmers. The most important crop is cloves, while other important products are coffee and vanilla. Services provide employment for 5% of the population.
