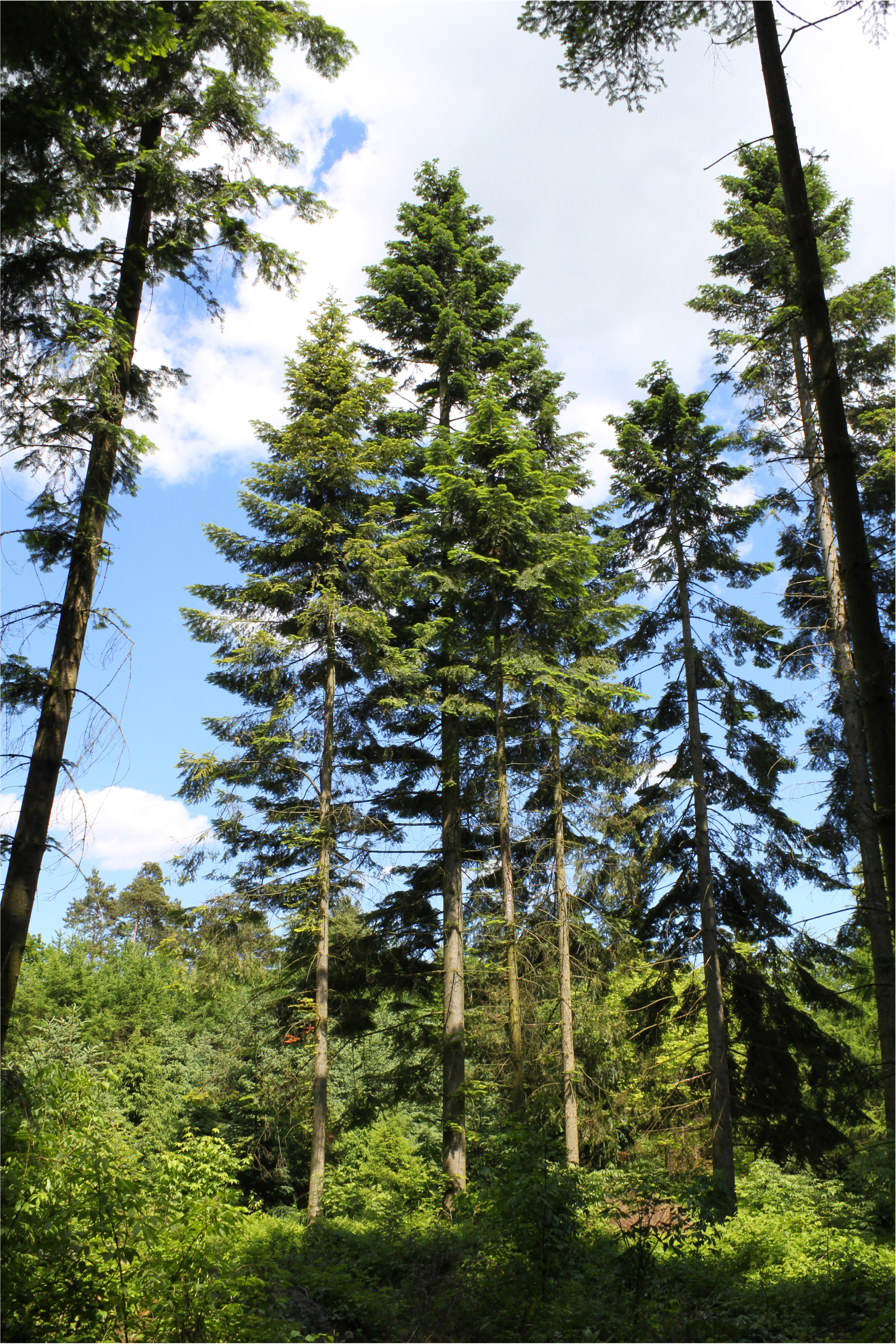

Conservation status
- Least Concern (IUCN 3.1)

- Secure (NatureServe)

Scientific classification
- Kingdom: Plantae
- Clade: Tracheophytes
- Clade: Gymnosperms
- Division: Pinophyta
- Class: Pinopsida
- Order: Pinales
- Family: Pinaceae
- Genus: Abies
- Species: A. grandis

Binomial name
- Abies grandis (Douglas ex D. Don) Lindley
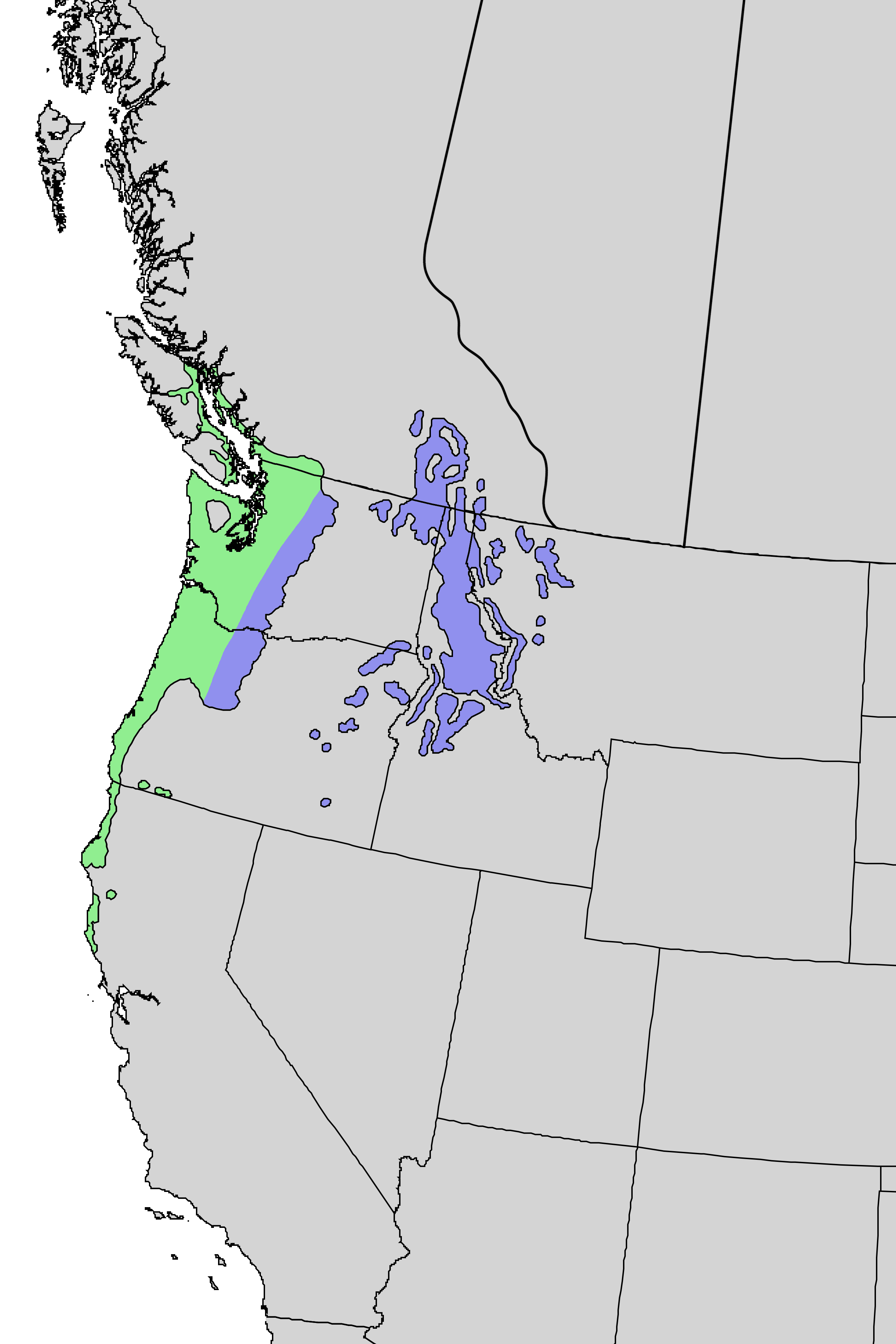
- Natural range of Abies grandis green - A. grandis ssp. grandis blue - A. grandis ssp. idahoensis

= Abies grandis =

Abies grandis Grand fir

Species of conifer tree

Abies grandis (grand fir, giant fir, lowland white fir, great silver fir, western white fir, Vancouver fir, or Oregon fir) is a fir native to northwestern North America, occurring at elevations of sea level to 1,700 metres (5,600 ft). It is a major constituent of the Grand Fir/Douglas Fir Ecoregion of the Cascade Range.

The tree typically grows to 40–70 m (130–230 ft) in height, and may be the tallest Abies species in the world. There are two varieties, the taller coast grand fir, found west of the Cascade Mountains, and the shorter interior grand fir, found east of the Cascades. It was first described in 1831 by David Douglas.

It is closely related to white fir. The bark was historically believed to have medicinal properties, and it is popular in the United States as a Christmas tree. Its lumber is a softwood, and it is harvested as a hem fir. It is used in paper-making, as well as construction for framing and flooring, where it is desired for its resistance to splitting and splintering.

== Description ==
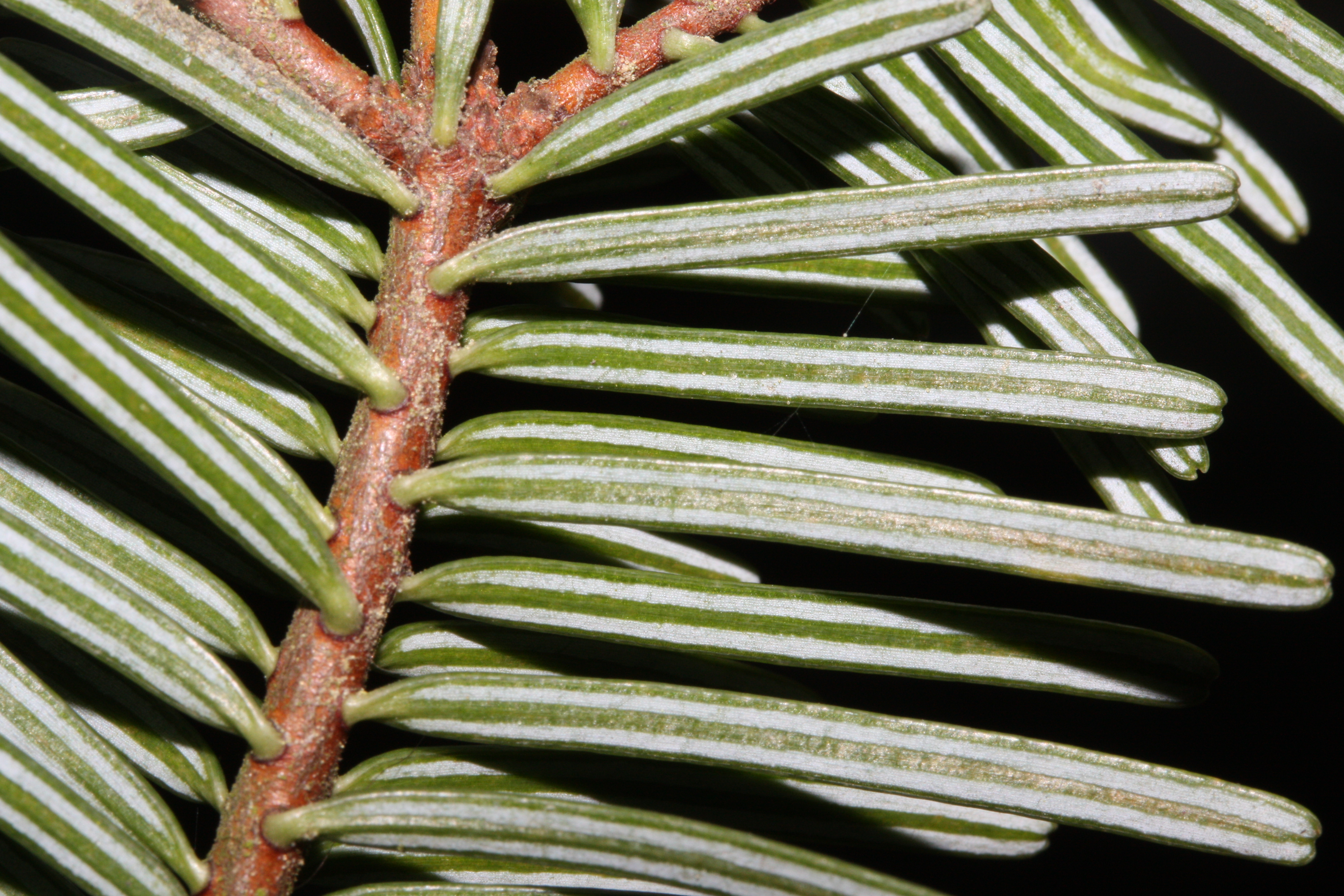
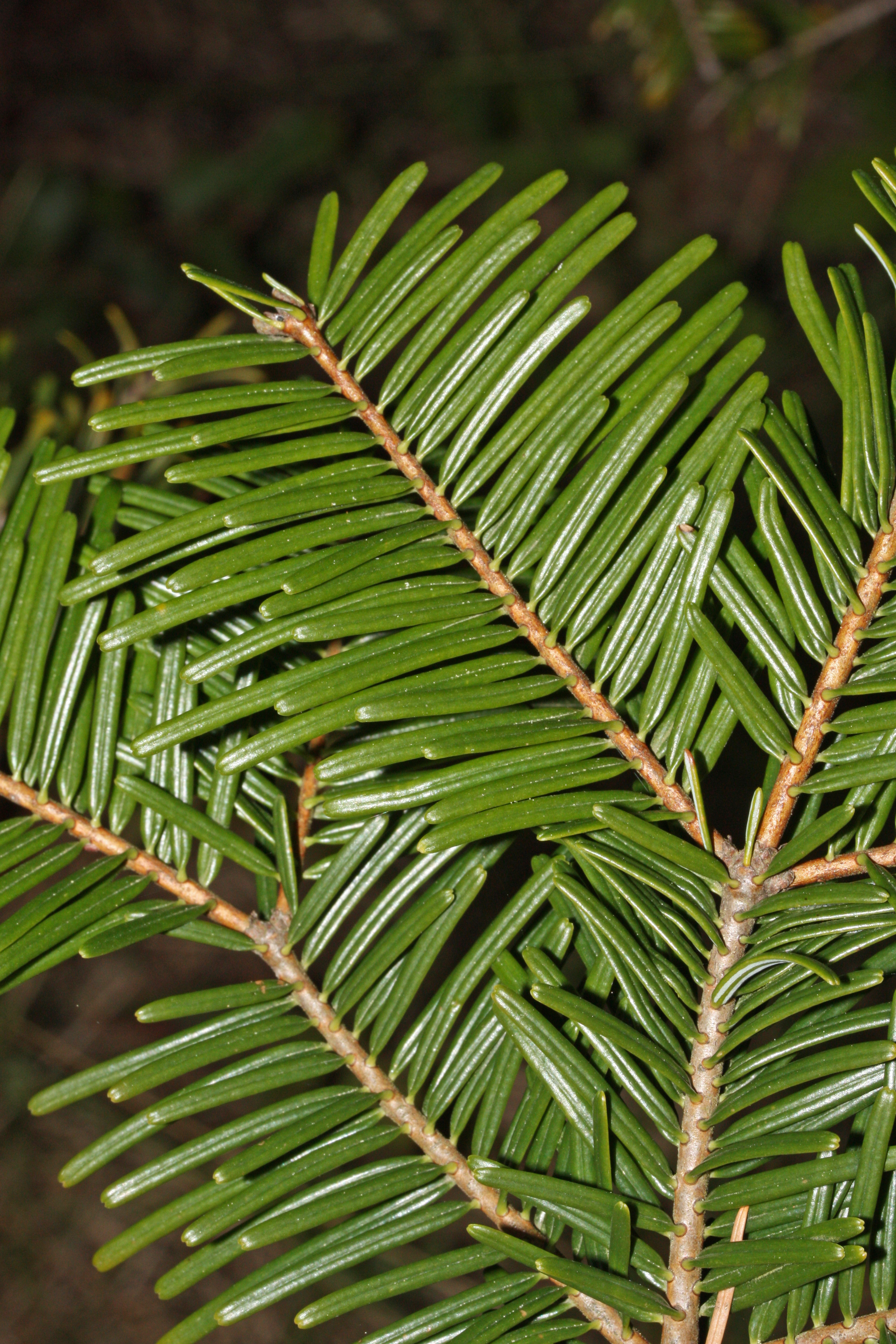
The bottom (left) and top (right) of the foliage

Abies grandis is a large evergreen conifer growing to 40–70 metres (130–230 feet) tall, exceptionally 100 m (330 ft), with a trunk diameter of up to 2 m (6 1/2 ft). The dead tree tops sometimes fork into new growth. The bark is 5 centimetres (2 inches) thick, reddish to gray (but purple within), furrowed, and divided into slender plates. The leaves are needle-like, flattened, 3–6 cm (1 1/8–2 3/8 in) long and 2 millimetres (3/32 in) wide by 0.5 mm thick, glossy dark green above, with two green-white bands of stomata below, and slightly notched at the tip. The leaf arrangement is spiral on the shoot, but with each leaf variably twisted at the base so they all lie in two more-or-less flat ranks on either side of the shoot. On the lower leaf surface, two green-white bands of stomata are prominent. The base of each leaf is twisted a variable amount so that the leaves are nearly coplanar.

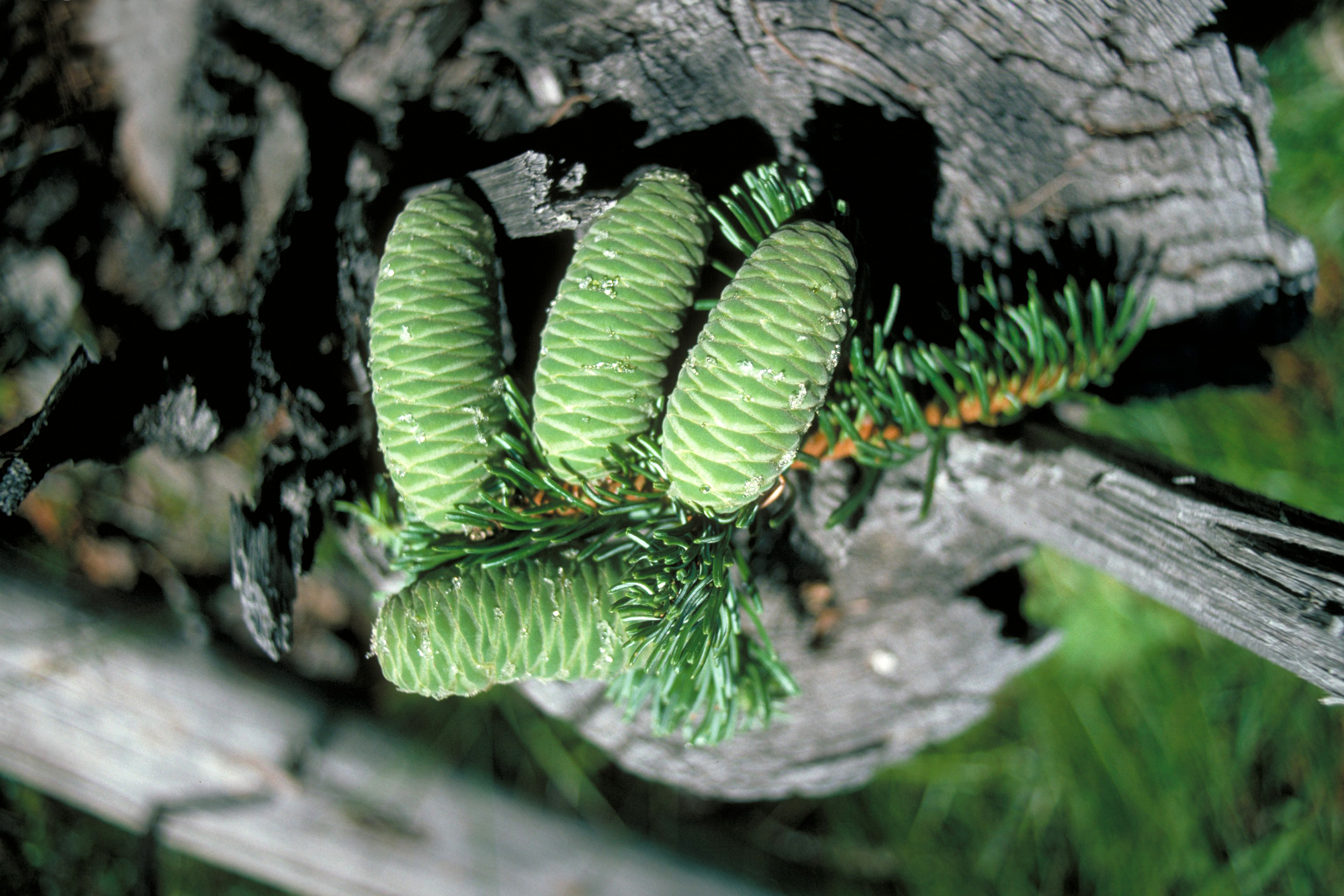
Cones

The green-to-reddish cones are 6–12 cm (2 1/4–4 3/4 in) long and 3.5–4.5 cm (1 1/2–1 3/4 in) broad, with about 100–150 scales; the scale bracts are short, and hidden in the closed cone. The winged seeds are released when the cones disintegrate at maturity about 6 months after pollination.

=== Varieties ===
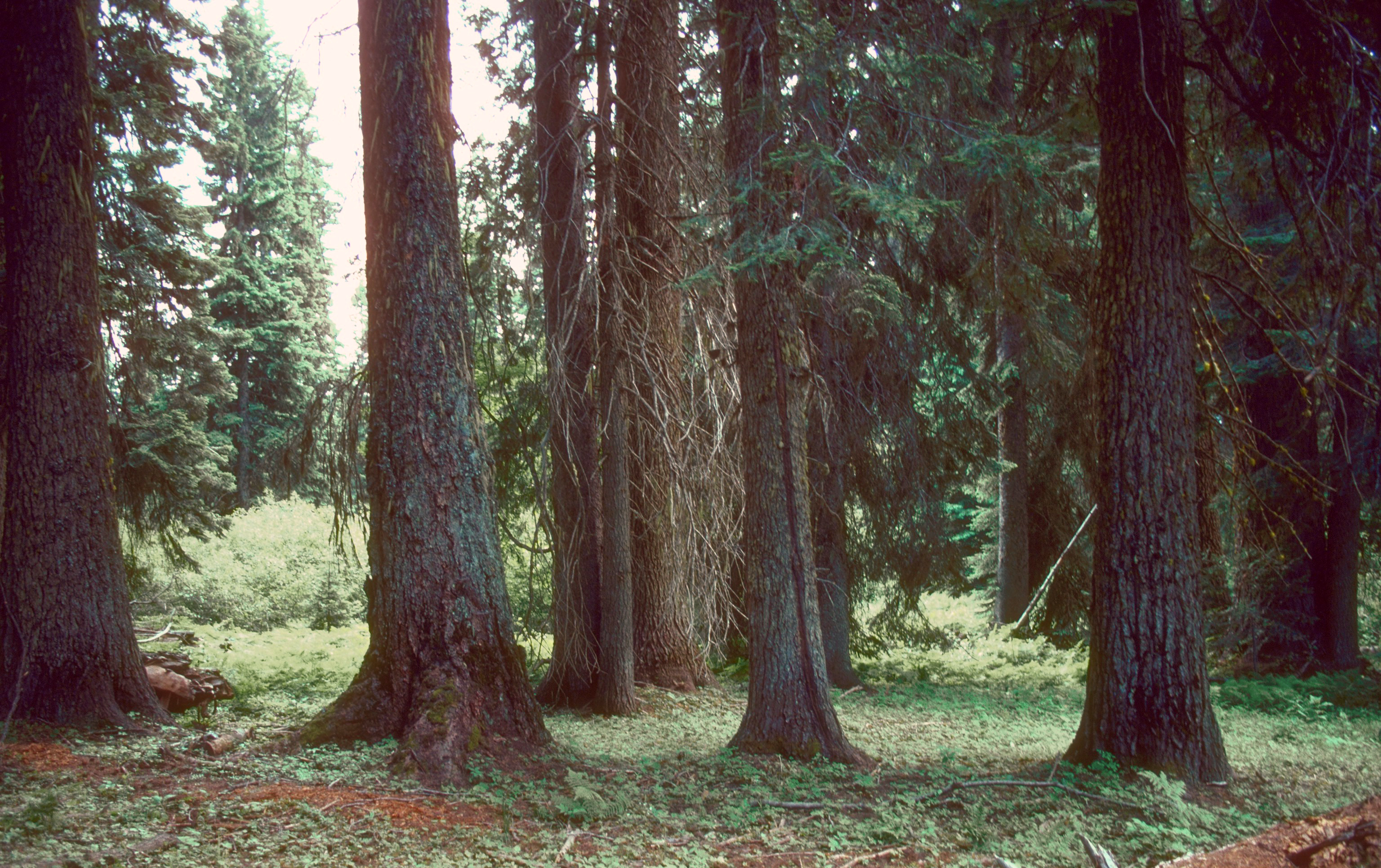
Old-growth copse in inland Oregon

There are two varieties, probably better treated at subspecies rank though not yet formally published as such:

- Abies grandis var. grandis. Coast grand fir. Coastal lowland forests, at sea level to 900 m elevation, from Vancouver Island and coastal British Columbia, south to Sonoma County, California. A large, very fast-growing tree to 70 m tall. Foliage strongly flattened on all shoots. Cones slightly narrower (mostly less than 4 cm broad), with thinner, fairly flexible scales. Tolerates winter temperatures down to about -25° to −30 °C; growth on good sites may exceed 1.5 m per year when young.
- Abies grandis var. idahoensis. Interior grand fir. Interior forests, at (600–) 900–1800 m elevation, on the east slope of the Cascades in Washington and in the Rocky Mountains from southeast British Columbia south to central Idaho, northeast Oregon and western Montana. A smaller, slow-growing tree to 40–45 m tall. Foliage not strongly flattened on all shoots, the leaves often raised above the shoot, particularly on upper crown shoots. Cones slightly stouter (mostly over 4 cm broad), with thicker, slightly woody scales. Tolerates winter temperatures down to about −40 °C; growth on good sites not exceeding 0.6 m per year even when young.

Grand fir is very closely related to white fir (Abies concolor), and intergrades with it in central Oregon. Firs of the Blue Mountains and Oregon East Cascade Slope are intermediate between the two species in genetics and appearance. The intergrades are often referred to as "Abies grandis x concolor", a variety which itself intergrades into Abies concolor lowiana farther south, around the California state line.

== Taxonomy ==
The species was first described by Scottish botanical explorer David Douglas, who in 1830 brought its seeds back to Britain; in 1831 he described specimens he had collected along the Columbia River in the Pacific Northwest.

== Distribution and habitat ==
The coastal variety of grand fir grows in temperate rainforest environments along the Pacific coast from southwest British Columbia to Northern California, with the inland variety growing in montane conifer forests of eastern Washington, the Idaho Panhandle, and far western Montana. It can be found growing at elevations of up to 1,700 m (5,600 ft). Habitats typically receive at least 640 mm (25 in) of annual rainfall, but are still too dry or outside the range of more shade-tolerant competitors like western hemlock and western redcedar. Along with the closely related white fir, grand fir is more shade tolerant than Douglas-fir.

== Ecology ==
Due to wildfire suppression, grand fir was able to proliferate in areas previously dominated by the relatively fire-resistant inland Douglas fir, ponderosa pine, and western larch. The lack of smaller fires allows both grand and white fir saplings to form a fuel ladder, enabling crown fires. Grand fir's bark is thinner than that of white fir, making the former species more susceptible to threats like fire and rot.

Specimens have historically been able to live up to nearly 300 years, but in modern stressed conditions, 100 years is more typical. A number of defoliating insects threaten the tree; in the late 20th century, western spruce budworm epidemics killed sizable populations of grand fir in the eastern Cascades and Blue Mountains. The lack of an ability to use pitch to patch wounds, including those from logging and small fires, provides a weakness exploited by rot fungi. East of the Cascade ridge, grand fir trunks are infected by Indian paint fungus, indicating a rotten core; such specimens are often waterlogged and thus crack apart in freezing weather.

Pileated woodpeckers search grand and white firs for insects and places to nest. Rotten cores open shelters for various animals, including black bears.

== Cultivation and uses ==
The boughs create a rain shelter for humans.

Native Americans used both grand fir and white fir, powdering the bark or pitch to treat tuberculosis or skin ailments; the Nlaka'pamux used the bark to cover lodges and make canoes, and branches were used as bedding. The inner bark of the grand fir was used by some Plateau Indian tribes for treating colds and fever. The Okanagan-Colville tribe used the species as a strengthening drug to nullify the feeling of weakness.

The foliage has an attractive citrus-like scent. It is sometimes used for Christmas decorations in the United States, including Christmas trees, although its stiff branches do not allow it to be economically packed. It is also planted as an ornamental tree in large parks.

=== Timber ===
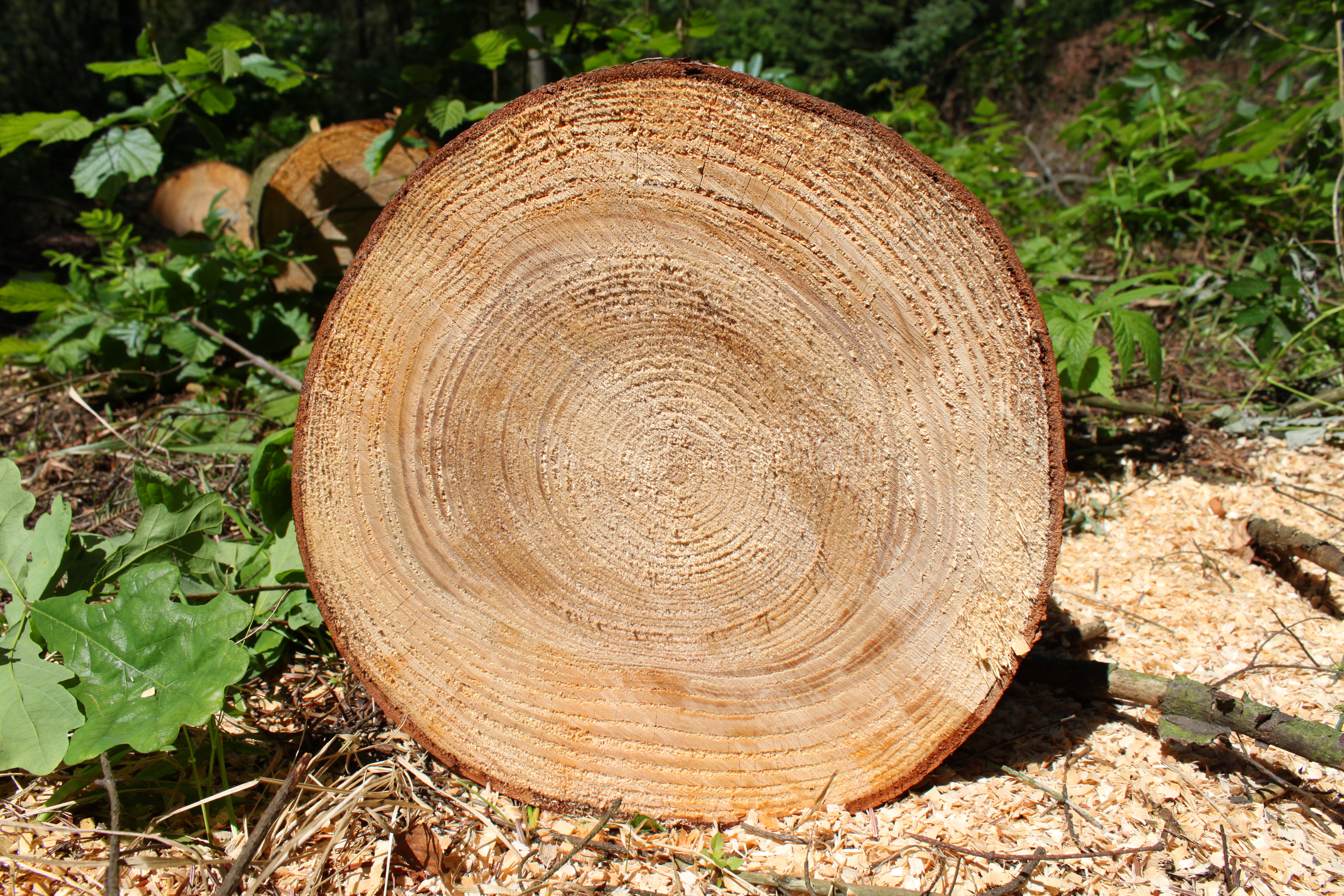
Trunk cross-section

The lumber is non-resinous and fine textured. In the North American logging industry, the grand fir is often referred to as "hem fir", with hem fir being a number of species with interchangeable types of wood (specifically the California red fir, noble fir, Pacific silver fir, white fir, and western hemlock). Grand fir is often shipped along with these other species. It can also referred to as "white fir" lumber, an umbrella term also referring to Abies amabilis (Pacific silver fir), Abies concolor (White fir), and Abies magnifica (Red fir).

Lumber from the grand fir is considered a softwood. As such, it is used for paper making, packing crates, and construction. Hem fir is frequently used for framing, and is able to meet the building code span requirements of numerous construction projects.

As a hem fir, the trunk of the grand fir is considered slightly below the "Douglas fir-larch" species combination in strength, and stronger than the "Douglas fir-South" and "spruce-pine-fir (South)" species combos (both umbrella terms for a number of species with similar wood). Because it is nearly as strong as Douglas fir-larch, it often meets the structural load-bearing requirements for framing in residential, light commercial, and heavy construction. Excluding Douglas fir-larch, hem fir's modulus of elasticity value as a stiffness factor in floor systems (denoted as MOE or E) is stronger than all other western species combinations. Hem fir is preferred by many builders because of its ability to hold and not be split by nails and screws, and its low propensity for splintering when sawed.

== Notable specimens ==
In February 2022, a coast grand fir growing south of Bergen was found to be Norway's tallest tree with height of 53.7 m (176 ft).
