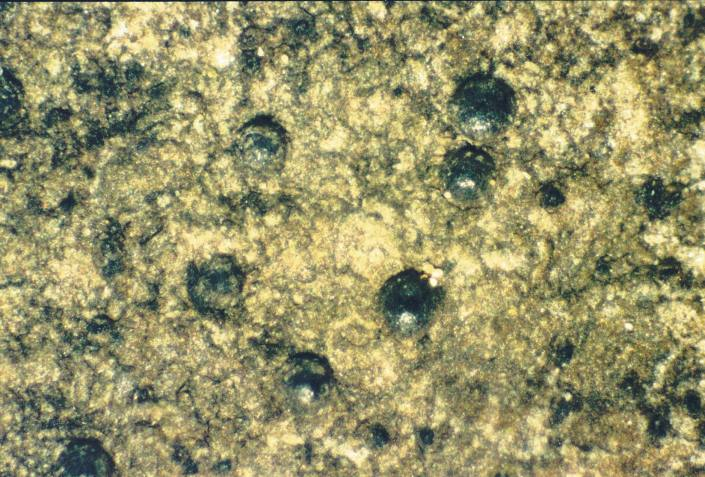
- Closeup (40X magnification) of a herbarium specimen of Scoliciosporum chlorococcum, showing dark brown apothecia

Scientific classification
- Kingdom: Fungi
- Division: Ascomycota
- Class: Lecanoromycetes
- Order: Lecanorales
- Family: Scoliciosporaceae; Hafellner (1984)

Genera
- Scoliciosporum; Umushamyces

= Scoliciosporaceae =

Family of lichen

Scoliciosporaceae is a family of lichen-forming fungi in the order Lecanorales. It contains two genera, the monotypic Umushamyces, and the type genus Scoliciosporum. The family was circumscribed by lichenologist Josef Hafellner in 1984.
