= Fluorone =

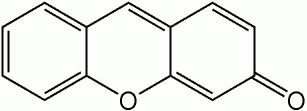

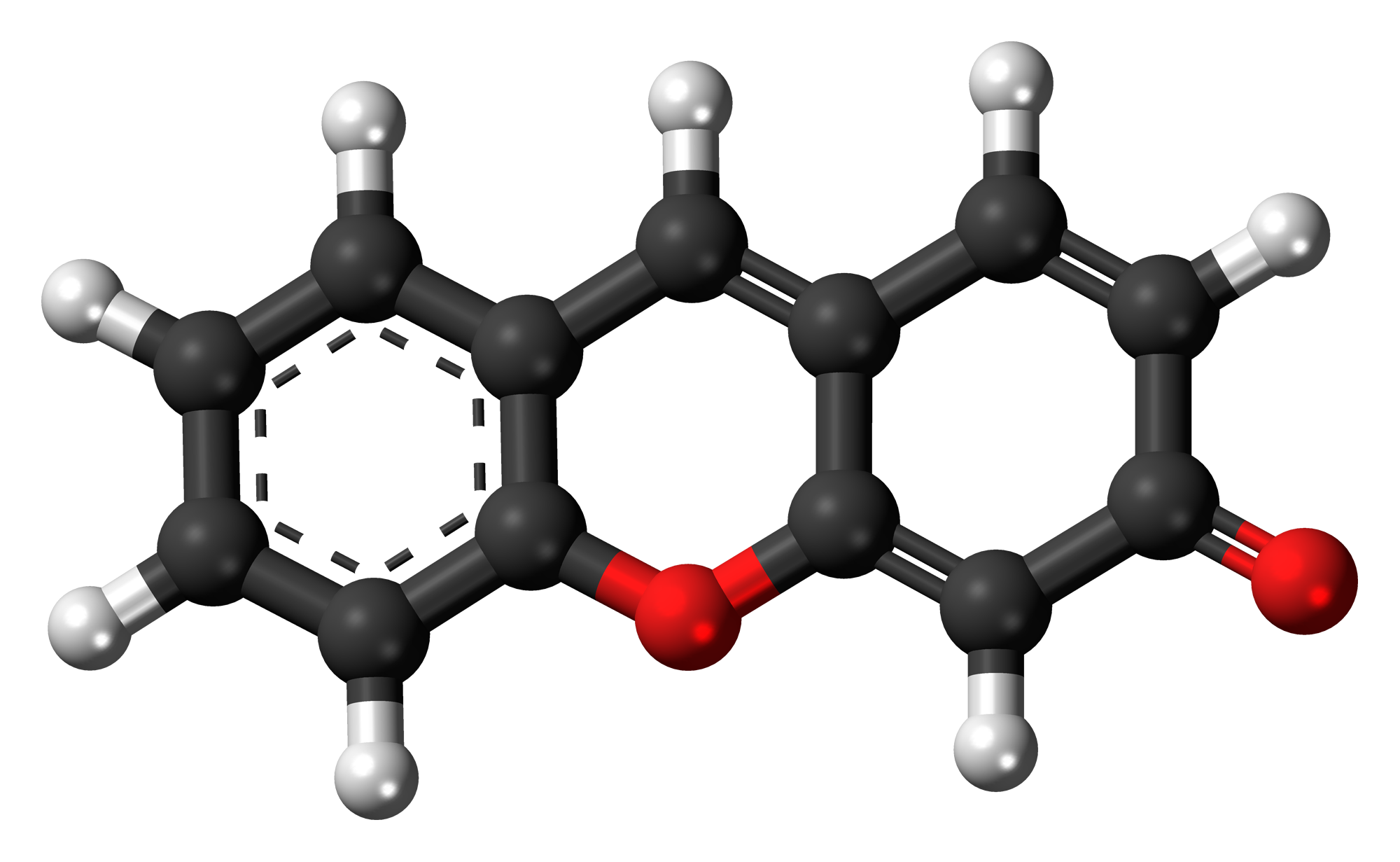

Names
- Preferred IUPAC name 3H-Xanthen-3-one
- Other names 3-Isoxanthone; 3-Oxo-3H-xanthene

Identifiers
CAS Number	494-41-7
3D model (JSmol)	Interactive image
ChemSpider	9507995
PubChem CID	11333049
UNII	7X94VF2YWN
CompTox Dashboard (EPA)	DTXSID60462625
- InChI: InChI=1S/C13H8O2/c14-11-6-5-10-7-9-3-1-2-4-12(9)15-13(10)8-11/h1-8H Key: FRIPRWYKBIOZJU-UHFFFAOYSA-N; InChI=1/C13H8O2/c14-11-6-5-10-7-9-3-1-2-4-12(9)15-13(10)8-11/h1-8H Key: FRIPRWYKBIOZJU-UHFFFAOYAE
- SMILES: O=C1C=CC2=Cc3ccccc3OC2=C1

Properties
Chemical formula	C_{13}H_{8}O_{2}
Molar mass	196.205 g·mol^{−1}
- Except where otherwise noted, data are given for materials in their standard state (at 25 °C [77 °F], 100 kPa). verify (what is ?) Infobox references

Fluorone is a heterocyclic chemical compound. It forms the core structure for various chemicals, most notably fluorone dyes, including fluorescein, erythrosine and rhodamine. It is an isomer of xanthone, sometimes referred to as an isoxanthone.

Chemical structure of erythrosine

== See also ==
- Xanthene
