= Mananara Nord =

Mananara Nord Mananara Avaratra
- Location in Madagascar
- Coordinates: 16°10′S 49°46′E
- Country: Madagascar
- Region: Ambatosoa
- District: Mananara Nord
- Elevation: 12 m (39 ft)

Population (2018)
  - Total: 35,148
- Time zone: UTC3 (EAT)
- code: 511

Mananara Nord or Mananara Avaratra is a municipality in Madagascar. It belongs to the district of Mananara Nord, which is part of the region of Ambatosoa. The population of the commune was 35,148 in 2018.

It is situated at the Route Nationale No.5 between Maroantsetra and Toamasina.

Mananara Nord is served by a local airport and maritime harbour. It also has riverine harbour at the North Mananara River that is located west of the town center.

In addition to primary schooling the town offers secondary education at both junior and senior levels. The town provides access to hospital services to its citizens.

A majority (50%) of the population of the commune are farmers. The most important crop is cloves, while other important products are coffee and vanilla. Services provide employment for 40% of the population. Additionally fishing employs 10% of the population.

== Nature ==
The Mananara-Nord National Park is near this city.
