= Route nationale 22 (Madagascar) =

Road in Madagascar

Location
- Country: Madagascar

Highway system
- Roads in Madagascar

Route nationale 22 (RN22) is a primary highway in Madagascar. The route runs from the capital city of Fenoarivo Atsinanana (Fénérive) to Anjahambe, a city on the eastern coast of the Madagascar.

== Selected locations on route (from east to west) ==
- Fenoarivo Atsinanana (Fénérive) (junction with RN 5)
- Vavatenina - mostly paved, 38 km
- Anjahambe

== See also ==
- List of roads in Madagascar
- Transport in Madagascar
