= Mananara River (Ambatosoa) =

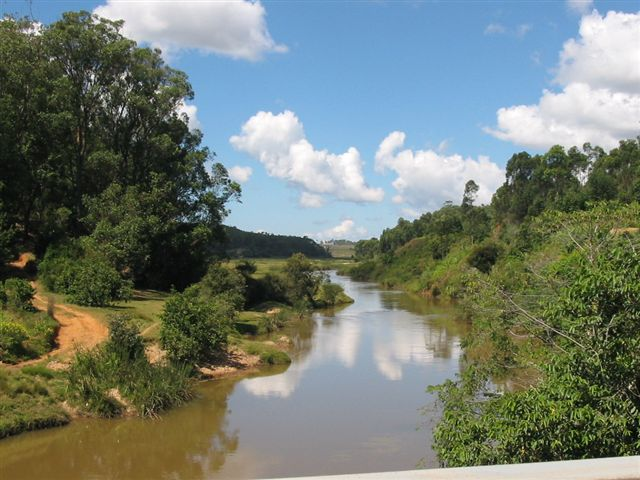
- the Mananara river

Location
- Country: Madagascar
- Region: Ambatosoa

Physical characteristics
- Mouth
  - location: Bay of Antongil, Indian Ocean
  - coordinates: 16°09′32″S 49°45′06″E
  - elevation: 0 m (0 ft)
- Length: 150 km (93 mi)
- Basin size: 2,498 km^{2} (964 sq mi)
- Discharge
  - location: Near mouth
  - average: (Period: 1971–2000)171.5 m^{3}/s (6,060 cu ft/s)

The Mananara River is one of the main rivers in north-eastern Madagascar. Its mouth is located in the Bay of Antongil near the city of Mananara Nord in the Ambatosoa region.
