= Vavatenina =

- Location in Madagascar
- Coordinates: 17°28′S 49°12′E
- Country: Madagascar
- Region: Analanjirofo
- District: Vavatenina

Area
  - Total: 193 km^{2} (75 sq mi)
- Elevation: 123 m (404 ft)

Population (2018)
  - Total: 35,750
- Time zone: UTC3 (EAT)
- Postal code: 518

Vavatenina is a municipality in Madagascar. It belongs to the district of Vavatenina, which is a part of Analanjirofo Region. The population of the commune was 35,750 in 2018.

In addition to primary schooling the town offers secondary education at both junior and senior levels. The town provides access to hospital services to its citizens. The majority 90% of the population of the commune are farmers. The most important crop is cloves, while other important products are coffee and rice. Services provide employment for 10% of the population.

The municipality is located on the National road 22 at 45 km from Fénérive-Est, by the National Road 5 and National Road 22.

== Sports ==
The local football club is FC Espérance Vavatenina.
