= Ampasina Maningory =

- Location in Madagascar
- Coordinates: 17°13′S 49°25′E
- Country: Madagascar
- Region: Analanjirofo
- District: Fenerive Est

Government
  - Mayor: Alexis Ralisimanana

Area
  - Total: 215 km^{2} (83 sq mi)
- Elevation: 17 m (56 ft)

Population (2001)
  - Total: 36,000
  - Ethnicities: Betsimisaraka
- Time zone: UTC3 (EAT)
- Postal code: 509

Ampasina Maningory is a rural municipality in Madagascar, located along the Maningory River, a few kilometers from the Indian Ocean. It belongs to the district of Fenerive Est, which is a part of Analanjirofo Region. The population of the commune was estimated to be approximately 36,000 in 2001 commune census.

Primary and junior level secondary education are available in town. The majority 95% of the population of the commune are farmers. The most important crop is cloves, while other important products are coffee and rice. Services provide employment for 2% of the population. Additionally fishing employs 3% of the population.

== Rivers ==
- The Maningory River crosses Ampasina Maningory and flows into the Indian Ocean at 6 km (3.7 mi) East of the town.

== Roads ==
The National road No. 5 goes through Ampasina Maningory. It is located 19 km (12 mi) north of Fenoarivo Atsinanana (Fénérive Est) and 110 km (68 mi) north of Toamasina.
