= Ambinanisakana =

- Location in Madagascar
- Coordinates: 16°57′S 49°35′E
- Country: Madagascar
- Region: Analanjirofo
- District: Soanierana Ivongo
- Elevation: 11 m (36 ft)

Population (2018)
  - Total: 26,990
- Time zone: UTC3 (EAT)
- Postal code: 516

Ambinanisakana is a rural commune in Madagascar. It belongs to the district of Soanierana Ivongo, which is a part of Analanjirofo Region. The population of the commune was estimated to be approximately 26,990 in 2018.

This commune was split off Soanierana Ivongo only in 2015.

The majority 80% of the population of the commune are farmers. The most important crops are cloves and lychee, while other important agricultural products are coffee, rice and vanilla. Services provide employment for 15% of the population. Additionally fishing employs 5% of the population.
