= Mahanoro, Fenerive Est =

Mahanoro
- Location in Madagascar
- Country: Madagascar
- Region: Analanjirofo
- District: Fenerive Est

Population (2018)
  - Total: 5,197
- Time zone: UTC3 (EAT)
- Postal code: 509

Mahanoro is a rural commune in Madagascar. It belongs to the district of Fenerive Est, which is a part of Analanjirofo Region.

The population of the commune was estimated to be approximately 5,197 inhabitants in 2018. This commune was split off Fenoarivo Atsinanana (Fenerive Est) only in 2015.
