= Antanifotsy, Soanierana Ivongo =

Antanifotsy
- Location in Madagascar
- Coordinates: 16°52′S 49°38′E
- Country: Madagascar
- Region: Analanjirofo
- District: Soanierana Ivongo
- Elevation: 11 m (36 ft)

Population (2001)
  - Total: 15,000
- Time zone: UTC3 (EAT)

Antanifotsy is a town and commune (Malagasy: kaominina) in Madagascar. It belongs to the district of Soanierana Ivongo, which is a part of Analanjirofo Region. The population of the commune was estimated to be approximately 15,000 in 2001 commune census.

Only primary schooling is available. The majority 95% of the population of the commune are farmers. The most important crops are rice and cloves, while other important agricultural products are lychee and vanilla. Services provide employment for 3% of the population. Additionally fishing employs 2% of the population.
