= Soanierana Ivongo District =

Soanierana Ivongo district
- Location in Madagascar
- Coordinates: 16°55′S 49°35′E
- Country: Madagascar
- Region: Analanjirofo
- District: Soanierana Ivongo
- Elevation: 11 m (36 ft)

Population (2018)
  - Total: 143,687
- Time zone: UTC3 (EAT)

Soanierana Ivongo is a district, which is a part of Analanjirofo Region, Madagascar. The population of the district was estimated to be 143,687 for 2018.

== Communes ==
The district is further divided into nine communes:

- Ambinanisakana
- Ambahoabe
- Ambodiampana
- Andapafito
- Antanifotsy
- Antenina
- Fotsialanana
- Manompana
- Soanierana Ivongo

== Infrastructure ==
Soanierana Ivongo is found along the National Road No.5 from Toamasina to Maroantsetra.

It is also the town where the ferry to Nosy Boraha (ile Sainte-Marie) leave.

== Rivers ==
In its north the town is bordered by the Marimbona river.

== Nature ==
- Ambatovaky Reserve
