= Iazafo =

River in Madagascar

Location
- Country: Madagascar
- Region: Analanjirofo

Physical characteristics
- Source
  - location: Analanjirofo
  - elevation: 0 m (0 ft)
- Mouth: Indian Ocean
  - location: Mahambo
  - coordinates: 17°27′00″S 49°29′00″E
  - elevation: 0 m (0 ft)
- Length: 103 km (64 mi)
- Basin size: 103 km^{2} (40 sq mi)

Iazafo is a small river in the east of Madagascar.

Its mouth is in the Indian Ocean at the city of Mahambo in the region of Analanjirofo.
