= Fotsialanana =

- Location in Madagascar
- Coordinates: 16°56′S 49°29′E
- Country: Madagascar
- Region: Analanjirofo
- District: Soanierana Ivongo
- Elevation: 51 m (167 ft)

Population (2001)
  - Total: 11,000
- Time zone: UTC3 (EAT)

Fotsialanana is a town and commune (Malagasy: kaominina) in Madagascar. It belongs to the district of Soanierana Ivongo, which is a part of Analanjirofo Region. The population of the commune was estimated to be approximately 11,000 in 2001 commune census.

Only primary schooling is available. The majority 95% of the population of the commune are farmers. The most important crop is cloves, while other important products are coffee, rice and vanilla. Services provide employment for 5% of the population.
