= Ambodimanga II =

- Location in Madagascar
- Coordinates: 17°16′S 49°10′E
- Country: Madagascar
- Region: Analanjirofo
- District: Fenerive Est
- Elevation: 277 m (909 ft)

Population (2001)
  - Total: 33,000
- Time zone: UTC3 (EAT)

Ambodimanga II is a town and commune (Malagasy: kaominina) in Madagascar. It belongs to the district of Fenerive Est, which is a part of Analanjirofo Region. The population of the commune was estimated to be approximately 33,000 in 2001 commune census.

Only primary schooling is available. The majority 90% of the population of the commune are farmers. The most important crop is cloves, while other important products are lychee and rice. Services provide employment for 10% of the population.
