= Saranambana =

- Location in Madagascar
- Coordinates: 17°15′S 49°11′E
- Country: Madagascar
- Region: Analanjirofo
- District: Fenerive Est
- Elevation: 272 m (892 ft)

Population (2001)
  - Total: 47,000
- Time zone: UTC3 (EAT)

Saranambana is a town and commune (Malagasy: kaominina) in Madagascar. It belongs to the district of Fenerive Est, which is a part of Analanjirofo Region. The population of the commune was estimated to be approximately 47,000 in 2001 commune census.

Primary and junior level secondary education are available in town. The majority 99% of the population of the commune are farmers. The most important crop is rice, while other important products are coffee and cloves. Services provide employment for 1% of the population.This Village was featured on an episode of The Grand Tour in where James, Jeremy and Richard go treasure hunting.
