= Calumma gallus =

Lance-nosed chameleon
- Lance-nosed chameleon

Conservation status
- Endangered (IUCN 3.1)

Scientific classification
- Domain: Eukaryota
- Kingdom: Animalia
- Phylum: Chordata
- Class: Reptilia
- Order: Squamata
- Suborder: Iguania
- Family: Chamaeleonidae
- Genus: Calumma
- Species: C. gallus

Binomial name
- Calumma gallus (Günther, 1877)
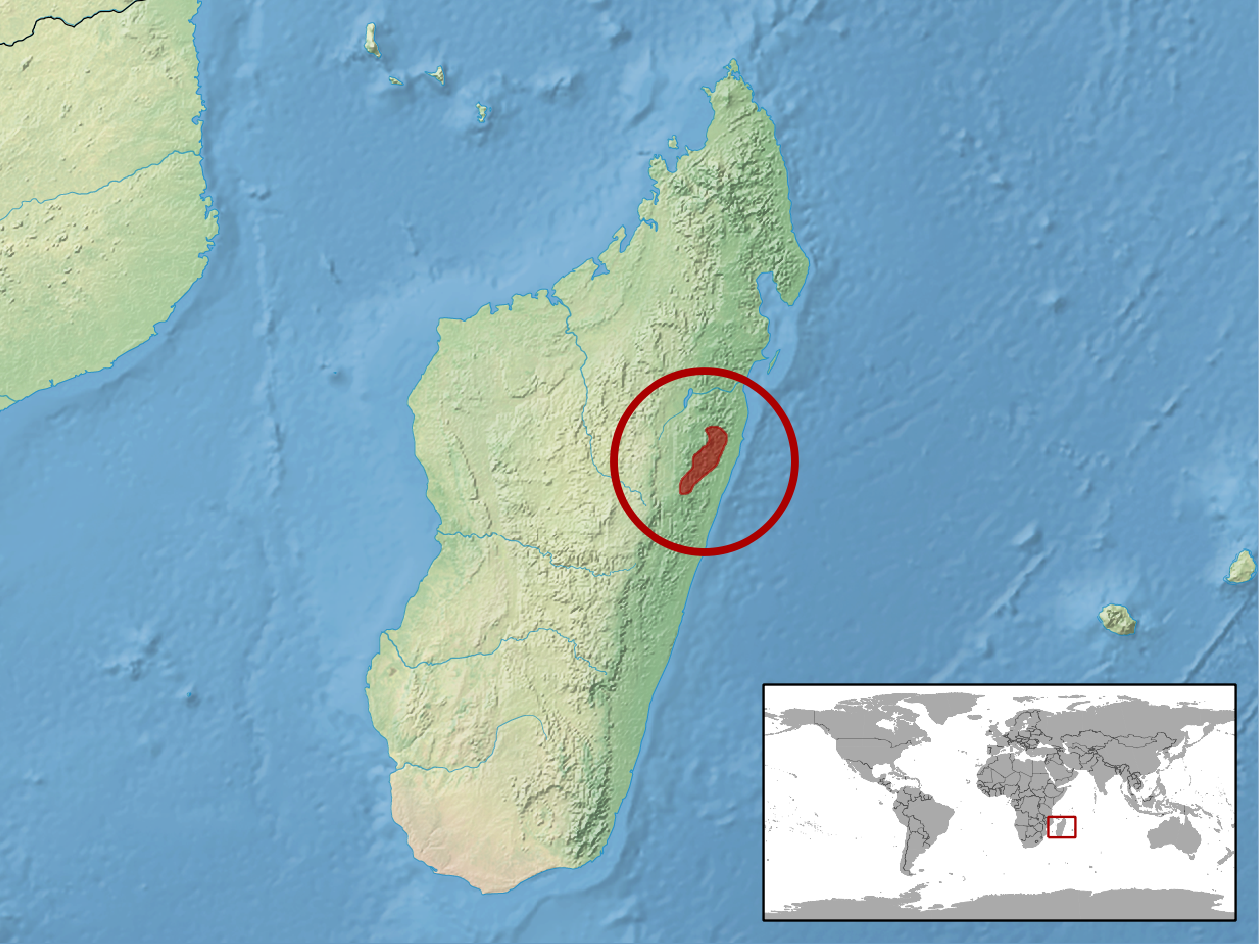
- Range of Calumma gallus according to the IUCN (2013)

Species of lizard

The lance-nosed chameleon (Calumma gallus), also known as a blade chameleon, is endemic to eastern Madagascar.

== Distribution and habitat ==
This chameleon is found in eastern Madagascar, in several areas including Ambavaniasy, Ampasimbe, Andekaleka, Betampona, Ile aux Prunes, Karianga, Lokomby, Mahanoro, Manombo, Vohidrazana and Zahamena.
