= Vohilengo, Fenerive Est =

Vohilengo
- Location in Madagascar
- Coordinates: 17°18′S 49°25′E
- Country: Madagascar
- Region: Analanjirofo
- District: Fenerive Est
- Elevation: 12 m (39 ft)

Population (2001)
  - Total: 18,000
- Time zone: UTC3 (EAT)

Vohilengo is a town and commune (Malagasy: kaominina) in Madagascar. It belongs to the district of Fenerive Est, which is a part of Analanjirofo Region. The population of the commune was estimated to be approximately 18,000 in 2001 commune census.

Primary and junior level secondary education are available in town. The majority 95% of the population of the commune are farmers. The most important crop is cloves, while other important products are bananas and coffee. Services provide employment for 5% of the population.
