= Grangeopsis =

Conservation status
- Endangered (IUCN 3.1)

Scientific classification
- Kingdom: Plantae
- Clade: Tracheophytes
- Clade: Angiosperms
- Clade: Eudicots
- Clade: Asterids
- Order: Asterales
- Family: Asteraceae
- Subfamily: Asteroideae
- Tribe: Astereae
- Subtribe: Grangeinae
- Genus: Grangeopsis; Humbert
- Species: G. perrieri

Binomial name
- Grangeopsis perrieri Humbert

Genus of flowering plants

Grangeopsis is a genus of flowering plants in the family Asteraceae.

Species

There is only one known species, Grangeopsis perrieri, an herb endemic to Madagascar.

== Range and habitat ==
Grangeopsis perrieri is native to central and western Madagascar (former Antananarivo and Mahajanga provinces. It is known from four locations, and has an estimated area of occupancy of 36 km^{2}. It grows in periodically-inundated areas at the edge of marshes between sea level and 1,340 meters elevation.

== Conservation and threats ==
The species is threatened by habitat destruction from draining and development of wetlands, conversion to agriculture, and wildfire. Only one of the four known populations is in a protected area. Its conservation status is assessed as endangered.
