= Mahambo =

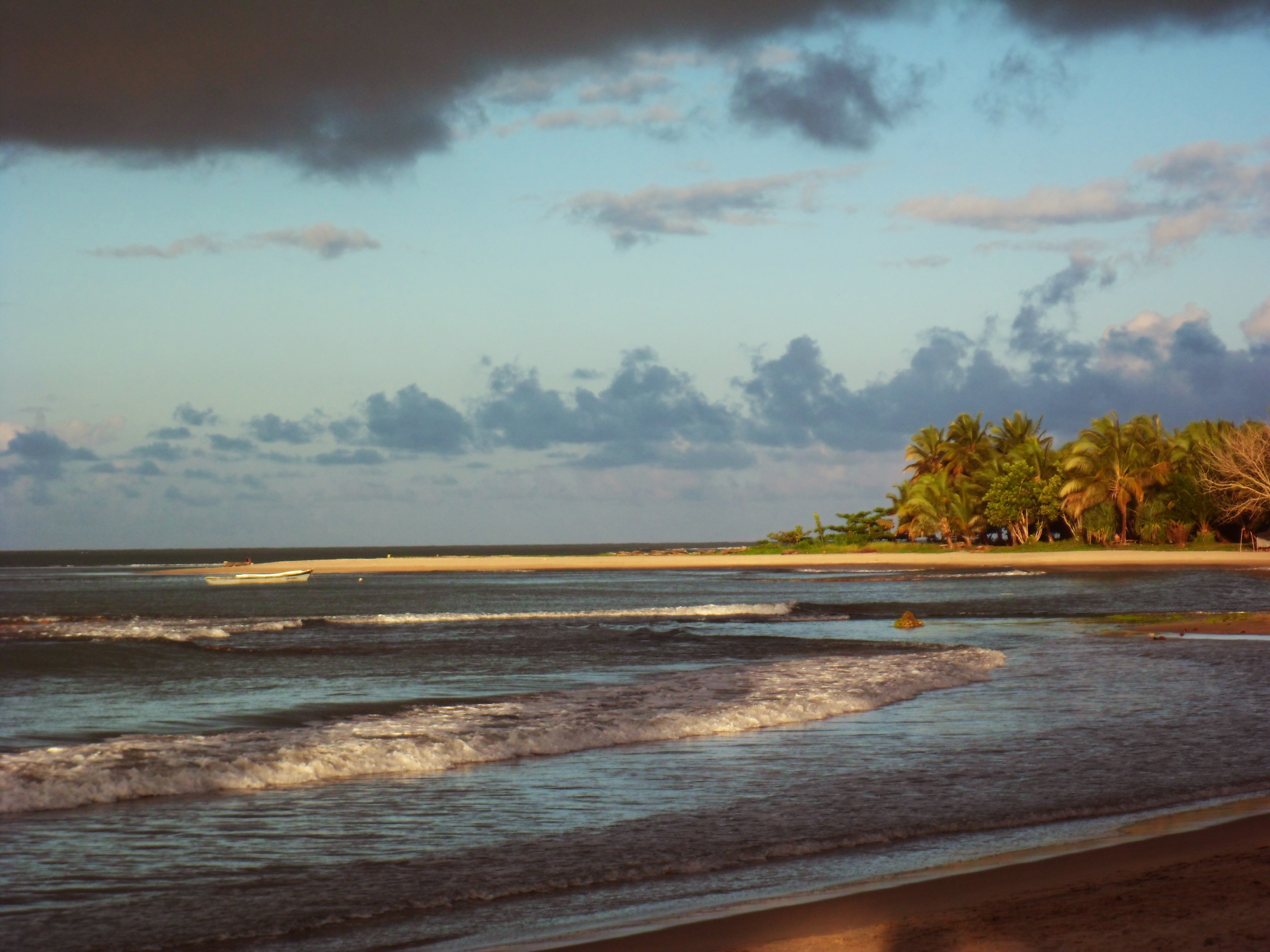
- beach at Mahambo

- Location in Madagascar
- Coordinates: 17°29′S 49°28′E
- Country: Madagascar
- Region: Analanjirofo
- District: Fenerive Est

Area
  - Total: 278 km^{2} (107 sq mi)
- Elevation: 13 m (43 ft)

Population (2001)
  - Total: 26,000
- Time zone: UTC3 (EAT)
- Postal code: 509

Mahambo is a rural municipality in Madagascar. It belongs to the district of Fenerive Est, which is a part of Analanjirofo Region. The population of the commune was estimated to be approximately 26,000 in 2001 commune census.

Primary and junior level secondary education are available in town. The majority 80% of the population of the commune are farmers. The most important crops are rice and bananas, while other important agricultural products are cloves and lychee. Services provide employment for 17% of the population. Additionally fishing employs 3% of the population.

== Geography ==
Mahambo is situated on the National road 5 at 95 km North from Toamasina on the Indian Ocean coast. The municipality is situated at the mouth of the river Iazafo.
