= Manompana =

- Location in Madagascar
- Coordinates: 16°41′S 49°44′E
- Country: Madagascar
- Region: Analanjirofo
- District: Soanierana Ivongo
- Elevation: 41 m (135 ft)

Population (2001)
  - Total: 16,000
- Time zone: UTC3 (EAT)

Manompana is a town and commune (Malagasy: kaominina) in Madagascar. It belongs to the district of Soanierana Ivongo, which is a part of Analanjirofo Region. The population of the commune was estimated to be approximately 16,000 in 2001 commune census.

Primary and junior level secondary education are available in town. The majority 90% of the population of the commune are farmers. The most important crops are rice and cloves; also coffee is an important agricultural product. Services provide employment for 8% of the population. Additionally fishing employs 2% of the population.
