= Ambanjan'i Sahalava =

- Location in Madagascar
- Country: Madagascar
- Region: Analanjirofo
- District: Fenerive Est

Population (2018)
  - Total: 10,593
- Time zone: UTC3 (EAT)

Ambanjan'i Sahalava is a town and commune (Malagasy: kaominina) in Madagascar. It belongs to the district of Fenerive Est, which is a part of Analanjirofo Region.

The population of the commune was estimated to be approximately 10,593 inhabitants in 2018.

Primary and junior level secondary education are available in town. The majority 95% of the population of the commune are farmers. The most important crop is rice, while other important products are coffee and cloves. Services provide employment for 5% of the population.
