= Protected areas of Madagascar =

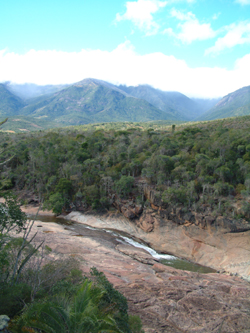
Andohahela National Park in southern Madagascar

The national parks of Madagascar include all officially recognized protected areas as of 2015. The protected areas network of Madagascar is managed by the Madagascar National Parks Association (PNM-ANGAP). The network includes three types of protected areas: Strict Nature Reserves (IUCN category Ia), National Parks (IUCN category II) and Wildlife Reserves (IUCN category IV). At the 2003 IUCN World Parks Congress in Durban, the Malagasy President, Marc Ravalomanana, announced an initiative to more than triple the area under protection from approximately 17,000 km^{2} (6,600 sq mi) to over 60,000 km^{2} (23,000 sq mi) (from 3% to 10% of Madagascar's area). This "Durban Vision", as it has been dubbed, involved broadening the definition of protected areas in the country and legislation has been passed to allow the creation of four new categories of protected area: Natural Parks (IUCN category II), Natural Monuments (IUCN category III), Protected Landscapes (IUCN category V), and Natural Resource Reserves (IUCN category VI). As well as allowing these new objectives for protected areas management, the new legislation also provided for entities other than PNM-ANGAP to manage protected areas, such as government ministries, community associations, NGOs and other civil society organizations, and the private sector.

== System of Protected Areas ==
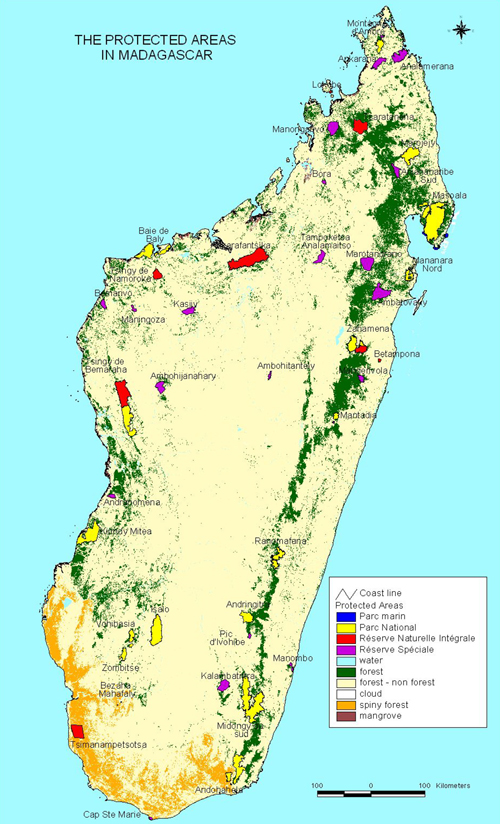
The National Parks and Reserves of Madagascar (as of 2006)

The protection of natural sites in Madagascar was initiated under the French colonial authority in 1927. These original sites were reserved for scientific research and were not open to the public. In 1971, the Malagasy government undertook a project to protect 3,000 km^{2} (1,200 sq mi) of mangrove forests, the first national effort to protect Madagascar's marine ecosystems. In 1986 the government of Madagascar, with support from the IUCN and the World Wildlife Fund, initiated a twelve-year process to review and assess existing protected areas and others requiring protection to create an initial list of Madagascar's conservation priority areas. The Association Nationale pour la Gestion des Aires Protégées (ANGAP), established in 1990, was the first government agency created with the express purpose of expanding and managing Madagascar's protected areas.

The creation of a national park system began in 1991 with the first major national policies for environmental protection and moved through three phases before concluding in 2002 with the establishment of the Système des Aires Protégées de Madagascar (SAPM). As co-president of this commission, the World Wildlife Fund supports the government of Madagascar in managing the parks while also developing management partnerships with a broader variety of partners, including local communities, civil society and the private sector. In 2003, an additional 92 areas were identified as meriting the status of protected area; some of these have since been accorded an official protected status, while others are pending review. Ensuring the legal status and protection of the complete list of areas added to meet the Durban Vision commitment requires an updating of the law concerning protected areas, which was stalled following the political crisis of 2009.

On 17 September 2003 at the IUCN World Parks Congress in Durban, President Marc Ravalomanana announced an expansion of Madagascar's protected areas from approximately 17,000 km^{2} (6,600 sq mi) to over 60,000 km^{2} (23,000 sq mi) (from 3% to 10% of Madagascar's area) over the next five years. The Malagasy government formed the Commission du Système des Aires Protégées de Madagascar (Commission for the Protected Areas System of Madagascar, SAPM) to work in partnership with the concerned government ministries (the Ministère de l’Environnement, des Eaux et Forêts [Ministry of Environment, Water and Forests] and the Ministère de l’Agriculture, de l’Elevage et de la Pêche [Ministry of Agriculture, Livestock and Fishery]). In March 2005, following a series of intensive collaborations with the IUCN and other international and local experts, the government put in place the current system of classification and legal protection for Madagascar's protected areas.

=== World Heritage Sites ===
In 1999, the Tsingy de Bemaraha National Park was declared a UNESCO World Heritage Site. In 2007, six other national parks were voted in as a joint World Heritage Site under the name Rainforests of the Atsinanana. These six parks are Marojejy, Masoala, Ranomafana, Zahamena, Andohahela and Andringitra National Park. UNESCO placed the Rainforests of the Atsinanana on the list of World Heritage in Danger on 30 July 2010, following an increase in illegal logging in the parks as a consequence of political crisis in the country in 2009.

== Protected Areas ==
=== Strict Nature Reserves ===
| Name | Photo | Location | Date established | Area | Description |
|---|---|---|---|---|---|
| Tsingy de Bemaraha Reserve | | Melaky | 1927 | 210,953 acres (853.7 km^{2}) | The area north of the Bemaraha National Park is reserved for scientific research and conservation of the highly endemic, diverse flora and fauna spanning the western coastal and inland transitional savanna ecosystems. |
| Betampona Reserve | | Atsinanana | 1927 | 7,215 acres (29.2 km^{2}) | This park is reserved for scientific research and conservation of the typical eastern lowland rainforest ecosystems. Many endemic plants with medicinal qualities are known to grow in this park, which shelters 93 bird species, of which 44 are endemic to Madagascar. |
| Tsaratanana Reserve | | Sofia | 1927 | 120,148 acres (486.2 km^{2}) | This park is reserved for scientific research and conservation of mountainous lowland and high altitude rainforest, including the highly endemic wildlife on the slopes of Mount Maromokotro, the highest in Madagascar. |
| Zahamena Reserve | | Alaotra Mangoro, Analanjirofo, Atsinanana | 1927 | 54,610 acres (221.0 km^{2}) | The central portion of Zahamena National Park is reserved for the conservation of several endemic and highly endangered plant and animal species. It is also the watershed of the Alaotra area, the highest producing agricultural area of the country. |

=== National Parks ===
| Name | Photo | Location | Date established | Area | Recreation Visitors (2013) | Description |
|---|---|---|---|---|---|---|
| Amber Mountain National Park | | Diana | 1958 | 44,973 acres (182.0 km^{2}) | 10,770 | This high altitude rain forest offers a cool, refreshing contrast to the hot plains surrounding the mountain. Countless waterfalls and streams cascade down the park's slopes and into its five lakes, providing drinking water for Antsiranana. The park is home to over 1,000 plant species and numerous lemur, amphibian and reptile species. |
| Analamazaotra National Park (Périnet) | | Alaotra Mangoro | 1989 | 2,002 acres (8.1 km^{2}) | | This park is connected to Mantadia National Park, forming the larger Andasibe-Mantadia protected area that shelters aye-aye, over 100 species of orchids, numerous ferns and palms, and the indri. |
| Andasibe-Mantadia National Park | | Alaotra-Mangoro | 1989 | 38,252 acres (154.8 km^{2}) | 25,684 | Connected by a forest corridor to Zahamena National Park, Mantadia shelters the island's largest lemur, the critically endangered indri. A wide variety of rare orchids bloom in this high altitude rainforest. |
| Andohahela National Park | | Anosy | 1939 | 187,849 acres (760.2 km^{2}) | 156 | Declared a World Heritage Site by UNESCO in 2007, this park includes typical southern spiny forest and the world's only rainforest south of the Tropic of Capricorn. Over 1,000 plant species grow in the park, including the triangle palm, which is nearly extinct in the wild. |
| Andringitra National Park | | Haute Matsiatra | 1927 | 76,998 acres (311.6 km^{2}) | 3,156 | Declared a World Heritage Site by UNESCO in 2007, this park offers spectacular vistas, strange rock formations, world class rock climbing and over 1,000 species of plants. The island's second tallest mountain, Imarivolanitra, lies within the park. |
| Ankarafantsika National Park | | Boeny | 2002 | 333,592 acres (1,350.0 km^{2}) | 4,421 | Containing dry deciduous forest, sandy savannas and numerous lakes and rivers, this park enjoys abundant animal diversity, particularly lemurs and birds. |
| Baie de Baly National Park | | Boeny | 1997 | 141,200 acres (571.4 km^{2}) | 100 | This park protects the unique ecosystem at the intersection of the marine reefs, the mangrove-lined coastal habitats and the dry deciduous forests of the northwest, providing refuge for species such as the dugong and the big-headed turtle. Over 86% of all waterfowl species in Madagascar are found in this park, where many of them have established colonies. |
| Isalo National Park | | Ihorombe | 1962 | 201,490 acres (815.4 km^{2}) | 28,375 | The most visited park in Madagascar, Isalo preserves a sandstone massif that has eroded over time to form dramatic and colorful canyons, plateaus and valleys. Seventeen rivers cut through the arid landscape, which is dotted with palms and inhabited by ringtail lemurs. |
| Kirindy Mitea National Park | | Menabe | 1997 | 178,410 acres (722.0 km^{2}) | unknown | This park protects the unique wildlife of the hot and dry transitional landscape between the western and southern ecosystems. Although diversity of species is lower relative to the eastern rainforests, endemism is very high, constituting 100% of its reptiles and amphibians, 91% of mammals in the park, 70%, of bird species and 70% of the park's plant species. |
| Lokobe National Park | | Diana | 1913 | 3,763 acres (15.2 km^{2}) | n/a | Extending over a portion of the island of Nosy Be and encompassing forest, coastal and marine ecosystems, this park protects one of the last examples of old growth coastal forest particular to the Sambirano area. Its status was changed from Strict Nature Reserve to National Park in June 2014. |
| Mananara Nord National Park | | Ambatosoa | 1989 | 355,832 acres (1,440.0 km^{2}) | 100 | Madagascar's first marine park comprises the marine ecosystems around a cluster of three islands. It was the first protected area to be included in the UNESCO global network of biosphere reserves. The coral reefs here are among the best in Madagascar. |
| Marojejy National Park | | Sava | 1952 | 148,387 acres (600.5 km^{2}) | 1,362 | Declared a World Heritage Site by UNESCO in 2007, Marojejy National Park protects the primary lowland coastal rainforest on and surrounding the sacred mountain of Marojejy. Numerous endemic bird species and 33% of all amphibian species found in Madagascar inhabit the park. |
| Marolambo National Park | | Atsinanana, Vakinankaratra, Amoron'i Mania, Vatovavy | 2015 | 480,098 acres (1,942.9 km^{2}) | | This national park, which comprises savannas and secondary forest interspersed with degraded forest and farms, forms a corridor between several of the UNESCO World Heritage Ala Atsinanana parks. Among the plants found in this area, 26% of the families and 95% of the species are endemic; 13 lemur species and many endemic amphibian and reptile species are also found here. |
| Masoala National Park, including Nosy Mangabe Reserve | | Sava, Ambatosoa | 1997 | 594,338 acres (2,405.2 km^{2}) | 2,480 | Declared a World Heritage Site by UNESCO in 2007, Masoala contains four parcels of primary rainforest ranging from sea level to 1,300 meters, and three adjacent marine parcels. Over 50% of all the plant and animal species found in Madagascar inhabit this park, which is the sole habitat of the endangered red ruffed lemur. |
| Midongy du sud National Park | | Atsimo-Atsinanana | 1997 | 474,932 acres (1,922.0 km^{2}) | unknown | Containing an especially high number of endemic medicinal plants, this mid to high altitude rainforest park also protects 14 endangered endemic animal species and groves of precious ebony and pallisander. |
| Nosy Hara National Park | | (marine) - Diana | 2012 | 452,477 acres (1,831.1 km^{2}) | | This island is the sole habitat of the world's smallest chameleon. The forested island features patches of tsingy and is ringed by very well preserved coral reefs. |
| Nosy Tanikely National Park | | (marine) - Diana | 2011 | 773 acres (3.1 km^{2}) | 22,051 | This marine park protects a network of coral reefs that host a variety of endemic and endangered Indian Ocean aquatic species, including sea turtles. |
| Nosy Ve-Androka National Park | | (marine) - Atsimo-Andrefana | 2015 | 4,853 acres (19.6 km^{2}) | | This park protects a network of coral reefs containing approximately 140 species of coral and over 240 species of fish, including fish of the very rare Coelacanth family. Dolphins, sea turtles and humpback whales are also common here. In July 2018, Tsimanampesotse – Nosy Ve Androka was established as Madagascar's 5th Biosphere Reserve |
| Ranomafana National Park | | Haute Matsiatra, Vatovavy, Fitovinany | 1991 | 102,798 acres (416.0 km^{2}) | 21,032 | Declared a World Heritage Site by UNESCO in 2007, this park protects transitional rainforest between typical eastern and southern ecosystems. It is home to 115 bird species (30 unique to the park) and the golden bamboo lemur. The hot springs here have long been visited for their healing properties. |
| Sahamalaza National Park | | (marine) - Sofia | 2007 | 64,247 acres (260.0 km^{2}) | unknown | Sahamalaza, also called Iles Radama, was initially a UNESCO Biosphere Reserve before being named a national park in 2007. About half of the park is underwater and comprises a network of coral reefs, while the remainder includes mangroves along the northwest coast and 75 square kilometers of some of the last remaining dry littoral forest on the west coast. The critically endangered Sahamalaza sportive lemur (fewer than 100 remaining) and Sclater's black lemur (the world's only blue-eyed non-human primate) are endemic to this forest. |
| Tsimanampetsotse National Park | | Atsimo-Andrefana | 1927 | 106,750 acres (432.0 km^{2}) | 1,186 | This park protects Lake Tsimanampetsotsa, Madagascar's only saline lake. It is in the area with the highest level of plant endemism in Madagascar, with 48% of the genera and 95% of the species endemic and is within the spiny thicket or "spiny desert" of southern Madagascar, a globally distinctive ecoregion. The park is home to a blind cave-dwelling goby and a large colony of flamingos year-round. In July 2018, Tsimanampesotse – Nosy Ve Androka was established as Madagascar's 5th Biosphere Reserve. |
| Tsingy de Bemaraha National Park | | Melaky | 1997 | 178,756 acres (723.4 km^{2}) | 9,561 | This park was declared a UNESCO World Heritage Site in 1990. It contains the largest of Madagascar's limestone tsingy fields, as well as dry forest, bush, rainforest and savanna. The biodiversity contained in this park is among the richest of any protected natural area in the world: 87% of the plants and animals are endemic to Madagascar, and 45% are uniquely endemic to the region around the park. |
| Tsingy de Namoroka National Park | | Boeny | 2002 | 54,924 acres (222.3 km^{2}) | unknown | The dramatic landscapes preserved in this park include tsingy, canyons, caves and pools. Connected to the Bay de Baly National Park, Namoroka's status was changed from a Strict Nature Reserve to a National Park in 2002. |
| Zahamena National Park | | Alaotra Mangoro, Analanjirofo, Atsinanana | 1997 | 104,526 acres (423.0 km^{2}) | unknown | Declared a World Heritage Site by UNESCO in 2007, this eastern rainforest park is home to a rich diversity of endemic animal species, including 112 species of birds, 29 fish species, 62 different amphibian, and 46 reptiles. On the 48 species of mammals counted, 13 are lemurs. |
| Zombitse-Vohibasia National Park | | Atsimo-Andrefana | 1997 | 89,719 acres (363.1 km^{2}) | 2,822 | The dry, hot southwestern forests protected by this park are intercut with rivers that support a variety of endemic wildlife, including 47% of all endemic bird species in Madagascar. |

=== Special Reserves ===
| Name | Photo | Location | Date established | Area | Description |
|---|---|---|---|---|---|
| Ambatovaky Special Reserve | | Analanjirofo | 1958 | 148,387 acres (600.5 km^{2}) | Ambatovaky is the largest protected lowland rainforest after Masoala and the largest of Madagascar's special reserves. 75% of the 291 plant species here are endemic. The reserve harbors 11 species of lemurs, 110 bird species, 113 species of amphibian and 34 fish species. |
| Amber Forest Reserve | | Diana | 1958 | 11,886 acres (48.1 km^{2}) | The reserve adjoins the Amber Mountain National Park and serves to protect the wealth of biodiversity and endemism common to both areas, including 1,020 plant species, of which many have medicinal properties. |
| Ambohijanahary Special Reserve | | Menabe, Melaky | 1958 | 61,159 acres (247.5 km^{2}) | The park protects the highly threatened sclerophyllous forest in the transitional zone between the western and central ecosystems. Altitudes vary from 200 to 900 meters above sea level, with dramatic variation in plant life following the increase in elevation. |
| Ambohitantely Special Reserve | | Analamanga | 1982 | 13,838 acres (56.0 km^{2}) | Ambohitantely protects the last remaining fragment of the forest that formerly covered the central highlands of Madagascar. This forest contains a blend of high altitude rainforest evergreen species interspersed with vegetation found in the mid-altitude sclerophyll forests to the west, including the threatened Manambe palm. |
| Analamerana Special Reserve | | Diana, Sava | 1956 | 85,746 acres (347.0 km^{2}) | This is the only reserve protecting the habitat of the critically endangered Perrier's sifaka. The reserve also shelters the eight rarest bird species in the world in its tsingy and forested canyons, where three of the island's seven baobab species grow. |
| Andranomena Special Reserve | | Menabe | 1958 | 15,864 acres (64.2 km^{2}) | Protecting the typical ecosystem of the Menabe region, this reserve's plant life is 80% endemic and includes the Grandidier's baobab and two other baobab species growing in their natural forest habitat. The Verreaux's sifaka and four other endangered lemur species inhabit the park. |
| Anjanaharibe-Sud Special Reserve | | Sava | 1958 | 79,296 acres (320.9 km^{2}) | This rainforest reserve ranges in altitude from 500 to 2,000 meters. It shelters immense plant and animal diversity, much of which is endemic, including 125 species of birds, 12 lemur species, 53 species of amphibians, 40 reptile species, 30 species of palms, and 300 fern species, of which four are found only within the reserve. This is the last habitat of Takhtajania, an angiosperm plant that evolved to its present state 120 million years ago. |
| Ankarana Special Reserve | | Diana | 1956 | 45,035 acres (182.3 km^{2}) | This park contains limestone tsingy, dry deciduous forests, a sacred lake, and the largest network of caves and underground lakes and rivers anywhere in Africa. |
| Bemarivo Special Reserve | | Melaky | 1956 | 28,590 acres (115.7 km^{2}) | The rivers, lakes and swamps of Bemarivo shelter 15 species of mammals, 20 species of reptile, six species of lemurs and three species of carnivores including the endemic fossa. Almost 47% of the reserve's 73 bird species are endemic to Madagascar, while another 30% are endemic to the Indian Ocean region. |
| Beza Mahafaly Special Reserve | | Atsimo-Andrefana | 1978 | 1,483 acres (6.0 km^{2}) | Beza Mahafaly contains the only protected gallery forest in Madagascar, which runs along the Sakamena River. A large portion of southwest Madagascar's radiated tortoise population lives in the park, alongside ring-tailed lemurs, sifaka, mouse lemurs and sportive lemurs. |
| Bora Special Reserve | | Sofia | 1956 | 11,962 acres (48.4 km^{2}) | The Bora forest represents the transitional ecosystem between the dry western forests and the eastern rain forests at the northern end of the island. Numerous bird species typically inhabiting either type of forest can be found here, of which 20 are endemic. |
| Cap Sainte Marie Special Reserve | | Androy | 1962 | 4,324 acres (17.5 km^{2}) | Also known as Cape Vohimena, this reserve protects the highly endangered radiated tortoise and the unique dwarf vegetation of this arid, desert-like region. Egg shell fragments of the extinct elephant bird litter the sand. Humpback whales migrate along the cape shore from August to November. The park's turtle population averages 3,000 turtles per square kilometer, one of the highest densities in the world. |
| Kalambatritra Special Reserve | | Ihorombe, Anosy | 1959 | 69,819 acres (282.5 km^{2}) | Separated from the Midongy du Sud National Park by a 20 kilometer savanna corridor, the Kalambaritra Reserve is unique in encompassing the ecosystems of the eastern lowland rainforest, southern spiny forest and central temperate forests in a single park, as well as expanses of marshlands that protect numerous fish species. It is rich in bird, lemur and amphibian species; threatened lemurs include the collared brown lemur and the common brown lemur. |
| Kasijy Special Reserve | | Betsiboka | 1956 | 48,927 acres (198.0 km^{2}) | This reserve is distinguished by the diversity of the ecosystems protected on this flat, hot plain, including swamps, savannas, steppes, dry deciduous forests and dense temperate forests. Among the 67 species of birds found here, 43% are endemic to Madagascar and 34% are endemic to Madagascar, Comoros and the Mascarene Islands. |
| Mangerivola Special Reserve | | Atsinanana | 1958 | 32,136 acres (130.0 km^{2}) | The low, medium and high altitude rainforests protected within the Mangerivola Reserve are home to 100 bird species, of which 63 are endemic to Madagascar and 23 are endemic to the region. These endemic species include the Madagascar serpent eagle – one of the rarest birds in the world – and one of the rarest owls, the endemic red owl. Half the chameleons found in the park are considered rare. |
| Maningoza Special Reserve | | Melaky | 1956 | 19,521 acres (79.0 km^{2}) | The dense dry forest of Maningoza is one of the best examples of this type of ecosystem, with 78% of its plant species endemic to Madagascar. It is one of the last examples of tropical dry forest on ironitic soil that formerly covered much of western Madagascar. |
| Manombo Special Reserve | | Atsimo-Atsinanana | 1962 | 13,146 acres (53.2 km^{2}) | The lowland rainforest of Manombo is home to a wide variety of animal species, of which 90% are endemic. It is the only protected area providing shelter to the endangered poisonous Bernhard's mantella frog, and hosts 52 species of endemic snails, the greatest diversity of any protected area in Madagascar. The reserve's flora include one of two species of the tree genus Allantospermum, the other being in Borneo; it is also the only protected habitat of the endemic Hintsia bijuga tree, formerly more widespread in the eastern rainforest. |
| Manongarivo Special Reserve | | Diana | 1956 | 80,890 acres (327.4 km^{2}) | The reserve protects a forest typical of the Sambirano area that shelters 11 plant species endemic to the reserve, as well as four types of lemur, 103 species of birds, 31 amphibian species, and 39 reptile species. The landscape of the reserve is dramatic. It ranges from 150 to 1,200 meters in altitude, encompassing low and high altitude dry deciduous forest growing over a stony massif of gneiss, granite and basalt that juts up abruptly to form mountains and cliffs. |
| Marotandrano Special Reserve | | Sofia, Alaotra-Mangoro | 1956 | 104,278 acres (422.0 km^{2}) | The deep, narrow valleys of Marotandrano are covered in dense mid-altitude rainforest and shelter 140 species of birds (56 endemic), 19 species of amphibian, 16 reptile species and 12 species of lemurs, including the black-and-white ruffed lemur. |
| Pic d'Ivohibe Reserve | | Ihorombe | 1964 | 8,532 acres (34.5 km^{2}) | Connected to Andringitra National Park, Ivohibe reserve shelters 77 species of birds in its dense low and mid altitude rain forests. The rivers running down its peak and surrounding slopes provide irrigation to the farms of surrounding communities. |
| Tampoketsa Analamaitso Reserve | | Sofia | 1958 | 42,379 acres (171.5 km^{2}) | One of the last examples of transitional forest between western and eastern forest ecosystems, Tampoketsa includes mid-altitude rainforest and dense dry deciduous forests. Almost half of the reserve's fauna is endemic, including 23 out of the park's 24 reptile species; the reserve also has unusually diverse snail and beetle populations. |

=== Other protected areas ===
| Name | Photo | Location | Date established | Area | Description |
|---|---|---|---|---|---|
| Ambato Atsinanana protected landscape | | Anosy | 2015 | 731 hectares (1,806.3 acres) | This protected area consists of three separate areas, which protect coastal strand, littoral forest, lowland rainforest, and mangrove habitats. It is part of the Sainte Luce Forest of southeastern Madagascar, which is home to several endemic species of plants and animals. |
| Makira Natural Park | | Maroantsetra, Antalaha, Mandritsara | 2012 | 3,850 km^{2} | The Makira forests represent one of the largest expanses of humid forest left in the biologically rich eastern rainforest biome of Madagascar. Makira is estimated to contain around 50% of Madagascar’s floral biodiversity and harbors the highest lemur diversity in the country with 17 species. |
| Ankeniheny Zahamena Forest Corridor | | Atsinanana, Analanjirofo, Alaotra Mangoro | 2015 | 916,761 acres (3,710.0 km^{2}) | This protected area, which comprises savannas and secondary forest interspersed with degraded forest and farms, forms a corridor between several of the UNESCO World Heritage Ala Atsinanana parks. Among the plants found in this area, 26% of the families and 95% of the species are endemic; 13 lemur species and many endemic amphibian and reptile species are also found here. |
| Fandriana Marolambo Forest Corridor | | Atsinanana, Vakinankaratra, Amoron'i Mania, Vatovavy | 2015 | 480,098 acres (1,942.9 km^{2}) | This protected area, which comprises savannas and secondary forest interspersed with degraded forest and farms, forms a corridor between several of the UNESCO World Heritage Ala Atsinanana parks. Among the plants found in this area, 26% of the families and 95% of the species are endemic; 13 lemur species and many endemic amphibian and reptile species are also found here. |
| Mahavavy-Kinkony Protected Area | | Boeny | 2006 | 682,010 acres (2,760.0 km^{2}) | Mahavavy-Kinkony encompasses dense dry forest, freshwater lake, saline bay and riverine delta ecosystems that are home to several critically endangered endemic species. |
| Mandena Conservation Zone | | Fort Dauphin | | | |
| Montagne des Français Protected Area | | Diana | 2013 | 15,053 acres (60.9 km^{2}) | This protected area to the east of Antsiranana is a dense and dry semi-deciduous forest covering a limestone plateau with canyons. A unique baobab species is endemic to this area, as are three vascular plant families and several animal species. |
