= Ambodiampana, Soanierana Ivongo =

Ambodiampana
- Location in Madagascar
- Coordinates: 16°49′S 49°34′E
- Country: Madagascar
- Region: Analanjirofo
- District: Soanierana Ivongo
- Elevation: 58 m (190 ft)

Population (2001)
  - Total: 11,000
- Time zone: UTC3 (EAT)

Ambodiampana is a town and commune (Malagasy: kaominina) in Madagascar. It belongs to the district of Soanierana Ivongo, which is a part of Analanjirofo Region. The population of the commune was estimated to be approximately 11,000 in 2001 commune census.

Primary and junior level secondary education are available in town. The majority 90% of the population of the commune are farmers. The most important crop is cloves, while other important products are coffee and rice. Services provide employment for 10% of the population.
