= Ambatoharanana =

- Location in Madagascar
- Coordinates: 17°19′S 49°17′E
- Country: Madagascar
- Region: Analanjirofo
- District: Fenerive Est

Area
  - Total: 95 km^{2} (37 sq mi)
- Elevation: 140 m (460 ft)

Population (2001)
  - Total: 6,000
  - Ethnicities: Betsimisaraka
- Time zone: UTC3 (EAT)
- Postal code: 509

Ambatoharanana is a rural municipality in Madagascar. It belongs to the district of Fenerive Est, which is a part of Analanjirofo region. The population of the commune was estimated to be approximately 6,000 in 2001 commune census.

Only primary schooling is available. The majority 82% of the population of the commune are farmers. The most important crop is cloves, while other important products are coffee and rice. Services provide employment for 18% of the population.

== Roads ==
This municipality is linked by the Provincial road 13 to the National road 5.
