= Vohipeno, Fenerive Est =

Vohipeno
- Location in Madagascar
- Coordinates: 17°10′S 49°18′E
- Country: Madagascar
- Region: Analanjirofo
- District: Fenerive Est
- Elevation: 131 m (430 ft)

Population (2001)
  - Total: 36,000
- Time zone: UTC3 (EAT)

Vohipeno is a town and commune (Malagasy: kaominina) in Madagascar. It belongs to the district of Fenerive Est, which is a part of Analanjirofo Region. The population of the commune was estimated to be approximately 36,000 in the 2001 commune census.

Primary and junior level secondary education are available in the town. The majority of the population of the commune are farmers, estimated to be about 98%. The most important crop is cloves, while other important products are coffee and rice. The service industry provides employment for 2% of the population.
