= Antsiatsiaka =

- Location in Madagascar
- Coordinates: 17°0′S 49°12′E
- Country: Madagascar
- Region: Analanjirofo
- District: Fenerive Est
- Elevation: 431 m (1,414 ft)

Population (2001)
  - Total: 27,000
- Time zone: UTC3 (EAT)

Antsiatsiaka is a town and commune (Malagasy: kaominina) in Madagascar. It belongs to the district of Fenerive Est, which is a part of Analanjirofo Region. The population of the commune was estimated to be approximately 27,000 in 2001 commune census.

Primary and junior level secondary education are available in town. The majority 95% of the population of the commune are farmers. The most important crop is cloves, while other important products are coffee, lychee and rice. Services provide employment for 5% of the population.
