= Antenina, Soanierana Ivongo =

Antenina
- Location in Madagascar
- Coordinates: 16°34′S 49°15′E
- Country: Madagascar
- Region: Analanjirofo
- District: Soanierana Ivongo
- Elevation: 477 m (1,565 ft)

Population (2001)
  - Total: 13,000
- Time zone: UTC3 (EAT)

Antenina (also Sahavalanina-Antenina) is a town and commune (Malagasy: kaominina) in Madagascar. It belongs to the district of Soanierana Ivongo, which is a part of Analanjirofo Region. The population of the commune was estimated to be approximately 13,000 in 2001 commune census.

Only primary schooling is available. The majority 97% of the population of the commune are farmers. The most important crops are rice and cloves; also coffee is an important agricultural product. Services provide employment for 3% of the population.
