= Miorimivalana =

- Location in Madagascar
- Coordinates: 17°13′S 49°12′E
- Country: Madagascar
- Region: Analanjirofo
- District: Fenerive Est
- Elevation: 283 m (928 ft)

Population (2001)
  - Total: 21,000
- Time zone: UTC3 (EAT)

Miorimivalana is a town and commune (Malagasy: kaominina) in Madagascar. It belongs to the district of Fenerive Est, which is a part of Analanjirofo Region. The population of the commune was estimated to be approximately 21,000 in 2001 commune census.

Only primary schooling is available. The majority 85% of the population of the commune are farmers, while an additional 7% receives their livelihood from raising livestock. The most important crop is cloves, while other important products are coffee, lychee and rice. Services provide employment for 8% of the population.
