= Andapafito =

- Location in Madagascar
- Coordinates: 16°55′S 49°23′E
- Country: Madagascar
- Region: Analanjirofo
- District: Soanierana Ivongo
- Elevation: 210 m (690 ft)

Population (2001)
  - Total: 16,000
- Time zone: UTC3 (EAT)

Andapafito is a town and commune (Malagasy: kaominina) in Madagascar. It belongs to the district of Soanierana Ivongo, which is a part of Analanjirofo Region. The population of the commune was estimated to be approximately 16,000 in the 2001 commune census.

Primary and junior level secondary education is available in the town. Ninety percent of the population of the commune are farmers. The most important crop is cloves, while other important products are coffee, rice and vanilla. The service sector provides employment for 10% of the population.
