= Amber Forest Reserve =

Wildlife reserve in Madagascar

- IUCN category IV (habitat/species management area)
- Location within Madagascar
- Nearest city: Joffreville
- Coordinates: 12.44°S 49.08°E
- Area: 48.1 km^{2} (18.6 sq mi)
- Established: 28 October 1958

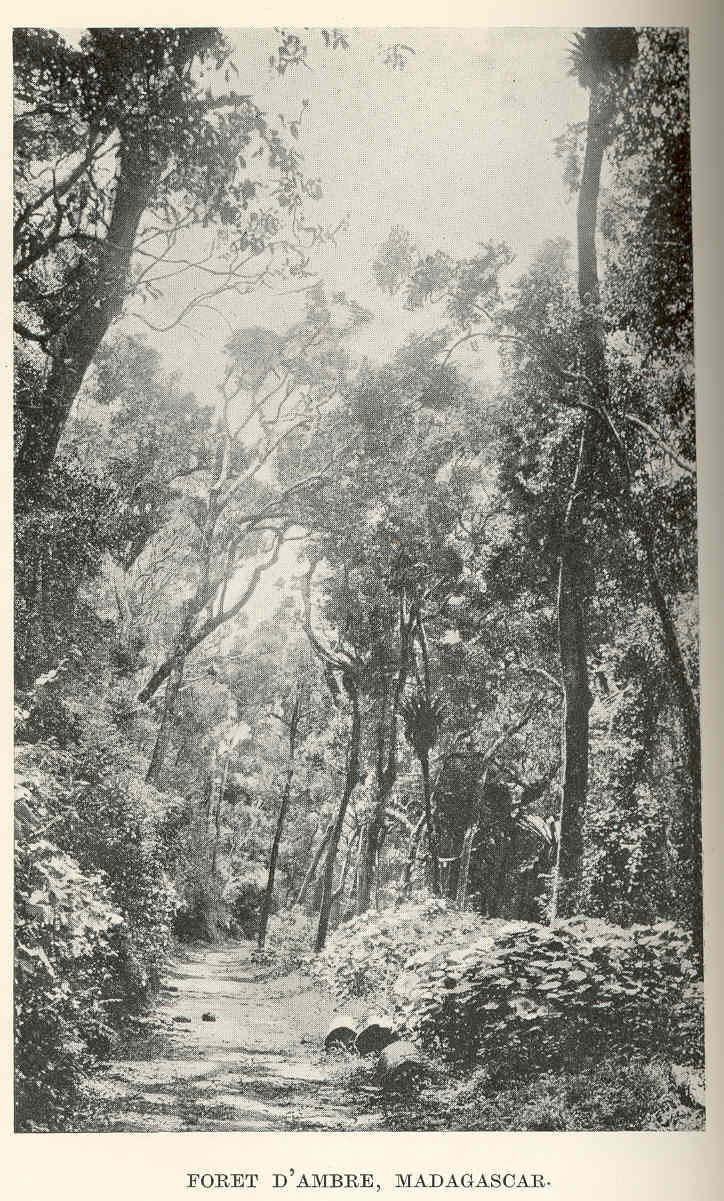

Amber Forest Reserve (French: Réserve de la Forêt d’Ambre) is a wildlife reserve of Madagascar.

The name comes from the flowers of some trees, which cover the mountain and shine with amber from afar.

== See also ==
- List of national parks of Madagascar
- Montagne d'Ambre National Park
