= Ampasimbe Manantsatrana =

- Location in Madagascar
- Coordinates: 17°6′S 49°26′E
- Country: Madagascar
- Region: Analanjirofo
- District: Fenerive Est
- Elevation: 26 m (85 ft)

Population (2001)
  - Total: 36,000
- Time zone: UTC3 (EAT)

Ampasimbe Manantsatrana is a town and commune (Malagasy: kaominina) in Madagascar. It belongs to the district of Fenerive Est, which is a part of Analanjirofo Region. The population of the commune was estimated to be approximately 36,000 in 2001 commune census.

Primary and junior level secondary education are available in town. The majority 95% of the population of the commune are farmers. The most important crop is cloves, while other important products are coffee, lychee, rice and vanilla. Services provide employment for 4.5% of the population. Additionally fishing employs 0.5% of the population.
