= Ambato Atsinanana =

Protected area in Madagascar

- IUCN category V (protected landscape/seascape)
- Area: 7.31 km^{2} (2.82 sq mi)
- Designation: Paysage Harmonieux Protégé (harmonious protected landscape)
- Designated: 2015

Ambato Atsinanana, also known as Ambatoatsinanana, is a protected area in Anosy Region of southeastern Madagascar.

It consists of three separate areas, which protect coastal strand, littoral forest, lowland rainforest, and mangrove habitats. It is part of the Sainte Luce Forest, which is home to several endemic species of plants and animals.

The protected area was established in 2015, and covers an area of 7.31 square kilometers. It is designated a Paysage Harmonieux Protégé (harmonious protected landscape). It is collaboratively governed.
