= Ambatovaky Special Reserve =

Tropical rainforest and wildlife reserve in Madagascar

- IUCN category IV (habitat/species management area)
- Location within Madagascar
- Nearest city: Soanierana Ivongo
- Coordinates: 16°0′S 49°16′E
- Area: 929.8 km^{2} (359.0 sq mi)
- Established: 1956
- Governing body: Madagascar National Parks Association

Ambatovaky Special Reserve is a tropical rainforest and wildlife reserve in the north-east of Madagascar (65,000 hectares (160,000 acres)). It is designated by Bird Life International as an Important Bird Area for the large number of endemic species of birds.

== Geography ==
This remote reserve ranges from the north-east coast of Madagascar to the Analamerana karstic plateau with elevations of 1,185 metres (3,888 ft) in the Soanierana Ivongo District, Analanjirofo region. It is between the Marimbona river, which forms the southern border, and the Simianona river which forms the northern border. The reserve headquarters are in Soanierana Ivongo and the park is only accessible by canoe along the Marimbona River.

== Flora and fauna ==
The reserve is mainly covered by dense deciduous dry forest and is the last place for the critically endangered lemur, Perrier's sifaka (Propithecus perrieri). There are five other species of lemurs found on the reserve. Four have been given the conservation status of endangered by the International Union for Conservation of Nature (IUCN) and one, the red-bellied lemur (Eulemur rubriventer) is a vulnerable species. The four endangered species are the aye-aye (Daubentonia madagascariensis), Indri (Indri indri), Diademed sifaka (Propithecus diadema) and the black-and-white ruffed lemur (Varecia variegata variegata). Two carnivores the Malagasy or striped civet (Fossa fossana) and the fossa (Cryptoprocta ferox) are also vulnerable species. The above mammals are all endemic to Madagascar.

The white-breasted mesite (Mesitornis variegata) is one of the fifty-five species of endemic birds found on the reserve, and is also one with a very restricted distribution, known from only six sites within the country. It is classified as vulnerable. So far ninety-two species of birds have been recorded. Other rare birds are Van Dam's vanga and the Madagascar pond heron.

There are also many amphibians, reptiles and insects. Two species of butterflies on the reserve are Papilio mangoura and Amauris nossima; both considered to be vulnerable species.
