= Fenoarivo-Atsinanana District =

Fenoarivo-Atsinanana
- District
- Location within Madagascar
- Country: Madagascar
- Region: Analanjirofo

Fenoarivo-Atsinanana is a district of Analanjirofo in Madagascar.

== Communes ==
The district is further divided into 14 communes:

- Ambanjan’i Sahalava
- Ambatoharanana
- Ambodimanga II
- Ampasimbe Manantsatrana
- Ampasina Maningory
- Antsiatsiaka
- Betampona
- Fenoarivo Atsinanana
- Mahambo
- Mahanoro
- Miorimivalana
- Saranambana
- Vohilengo
- Vohipeno
