= Macrophycis malazella =

Scientific classification
- Kingdom: Animalia
- Phylum: Arthropoda
- Class: Insecta
- Order: Lepidoptera
- Family: Pyralidae
- Genus: Macrophycis
- Species: M. malazella

Binomial name
- Macrophycis malazella (Viette, 1964)

Synonyms
- Piesmopoda malazella Viette, 1964

Species of moth

Macrophycis malazella is a species of snout moth in the genus Macrophycis. It was described by Viette in 1964, and is known from Madagascar (including Ambatovositra, the type locality).
