= Marimbona =

Location
- Country: Madagascar
- Region: Analanjirofo
- City: Soanierana Ivongo

Physical characteristics
- Source
  - location: Andilamena, Alaotra Mangoro
- Mouth: Indian Ocean
  - location: Soanierana Ivongo, Analanjirofo
  - coordinates: 16°54′S 49°35′E
  - elevation: 0 m (0 ft)
- Basin size: 1,495 km^{2} (577 sq mi)
- Discharge
  - location: RN 5

Basin features
- Tributaries
  - right: Andasibe river, Ambohangy, Fotsialana, Sahatiana, Sahasarotra

The Marimbona river is located in northern Madagascar and crosses the Route Nationale 5 near Soanierana Ivongo. It has its springs near Andilamena (Alaotra Mangoro), forms the southern border of the Ambatovaky Reserve, passes Andapafito and flows into the Indian Ocean north of Soanierana Ivongo.
