= Macrophycis =

Scientific classification
- Domain: Eukaryota
- Kingdom: Animalia
- Phylum: Arthropoda
- Class: Insecta
- Order: Lepidoptera
- Family: Pyralidae
- Subfamily: Phycitinae
- Genus: Macrophycis; Roesler, 1982

Genus of moths

Macrophycis is a genus of snout moths described by Rolf-Ulrich Roesler in 1982.

== Species ==
- Macrophycis alluaudella (Viette, 1964)
- Macrophycis ambrella (Viette, 1964)
- Macrophycis malazella (Viette, 1964)
