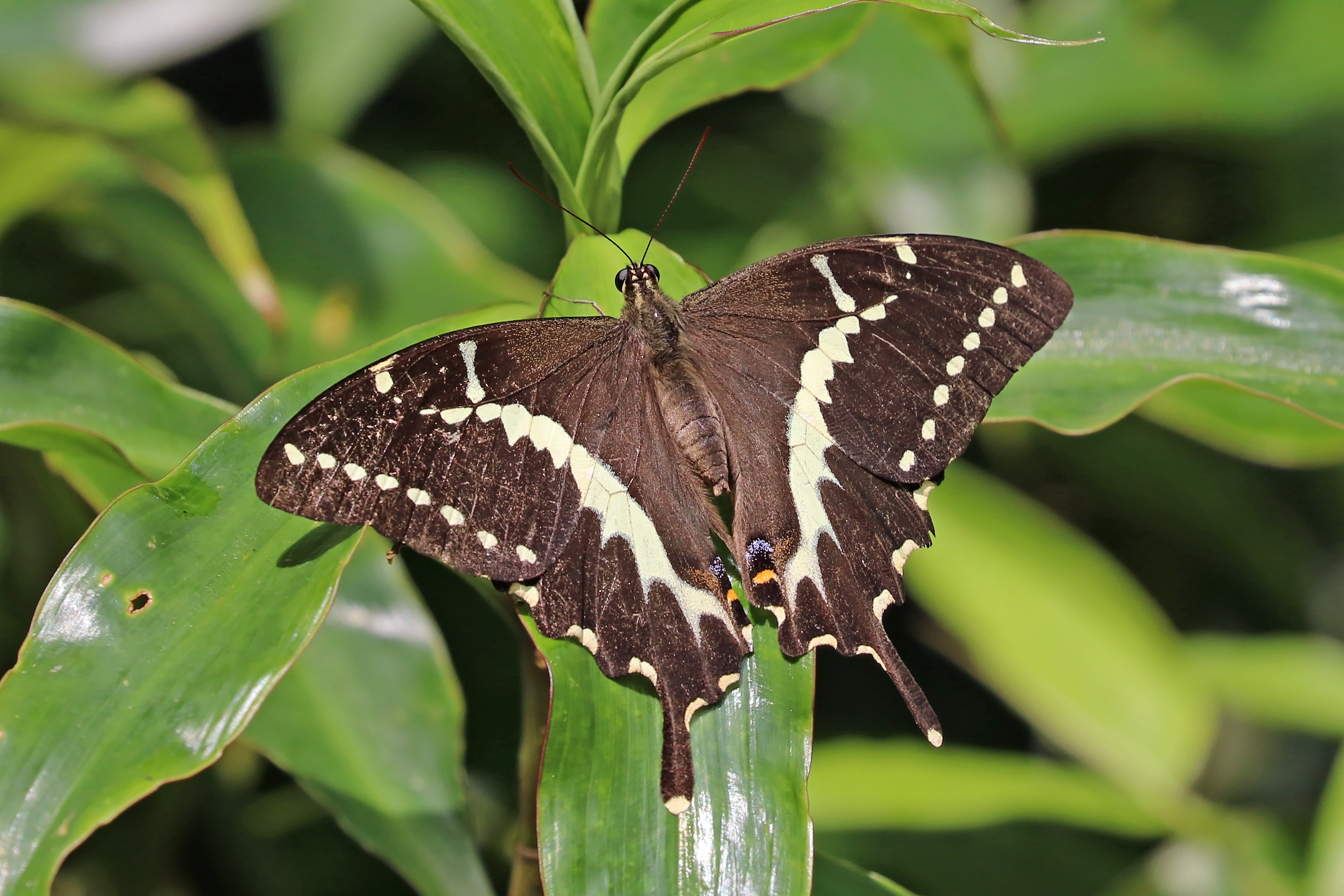

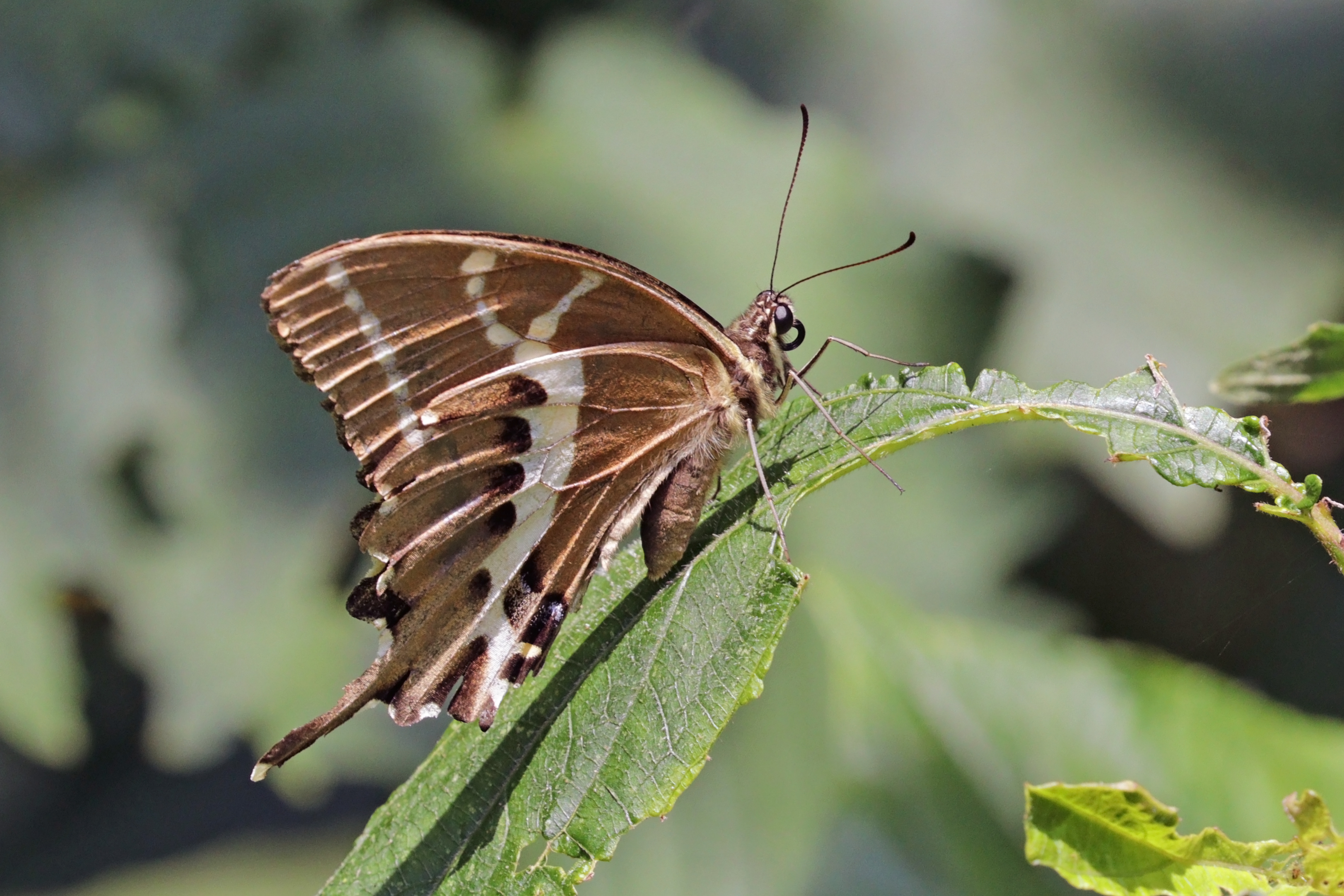
- both female Montagne d'Ambre National Park

Conservation status
- Vulnerable (IUCN 2.3)

Scientific classification
- Kingdom: Animalia
- Phylum: Arthropoda
- Clade: Pancrustacea
- Class: Insecta
- Order: Lepidoptera
- Family: Papilionidae
- Genus: Papilio
- Species: P. mangoura

Binomial name
- Papilio mangoura Hewitson, 1875

= Papilio mangoura =

Species of butterfly

Papilio mangoura is a species of butterfly in the family Papilionidae. It is endemic to Madagascar. The habitat consists of forests.

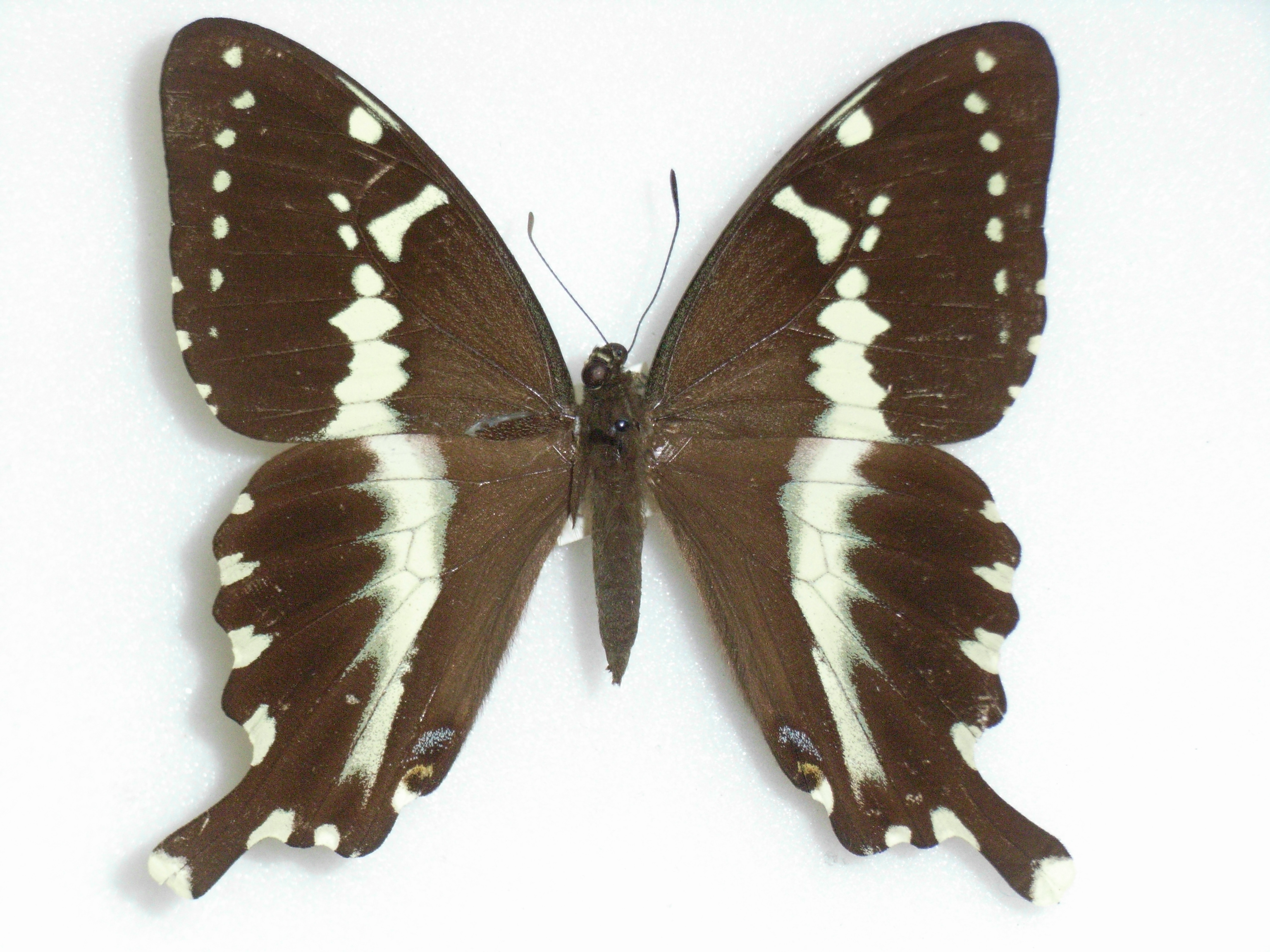
Female

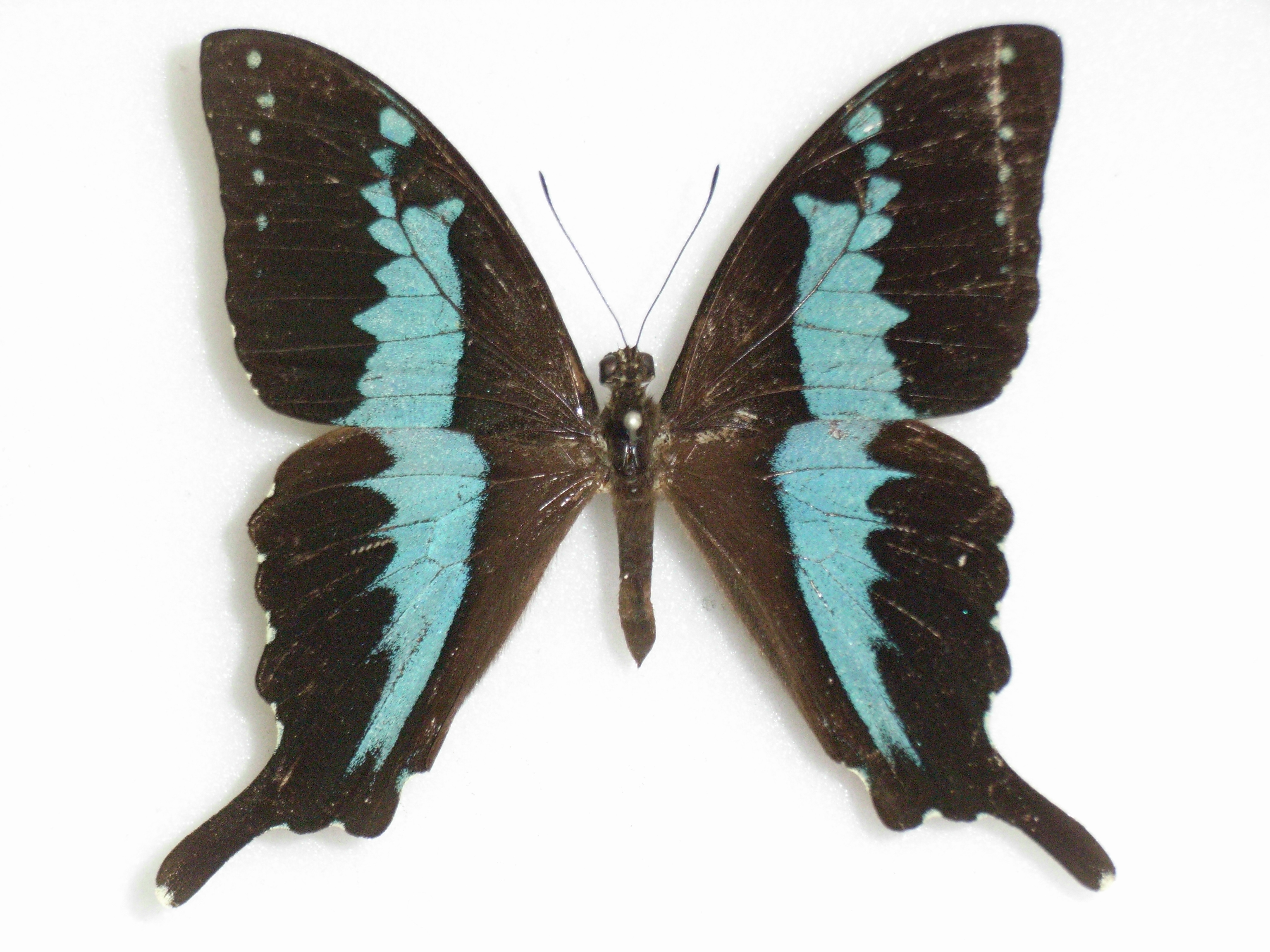
Male
