= Soanierana Ivongo =

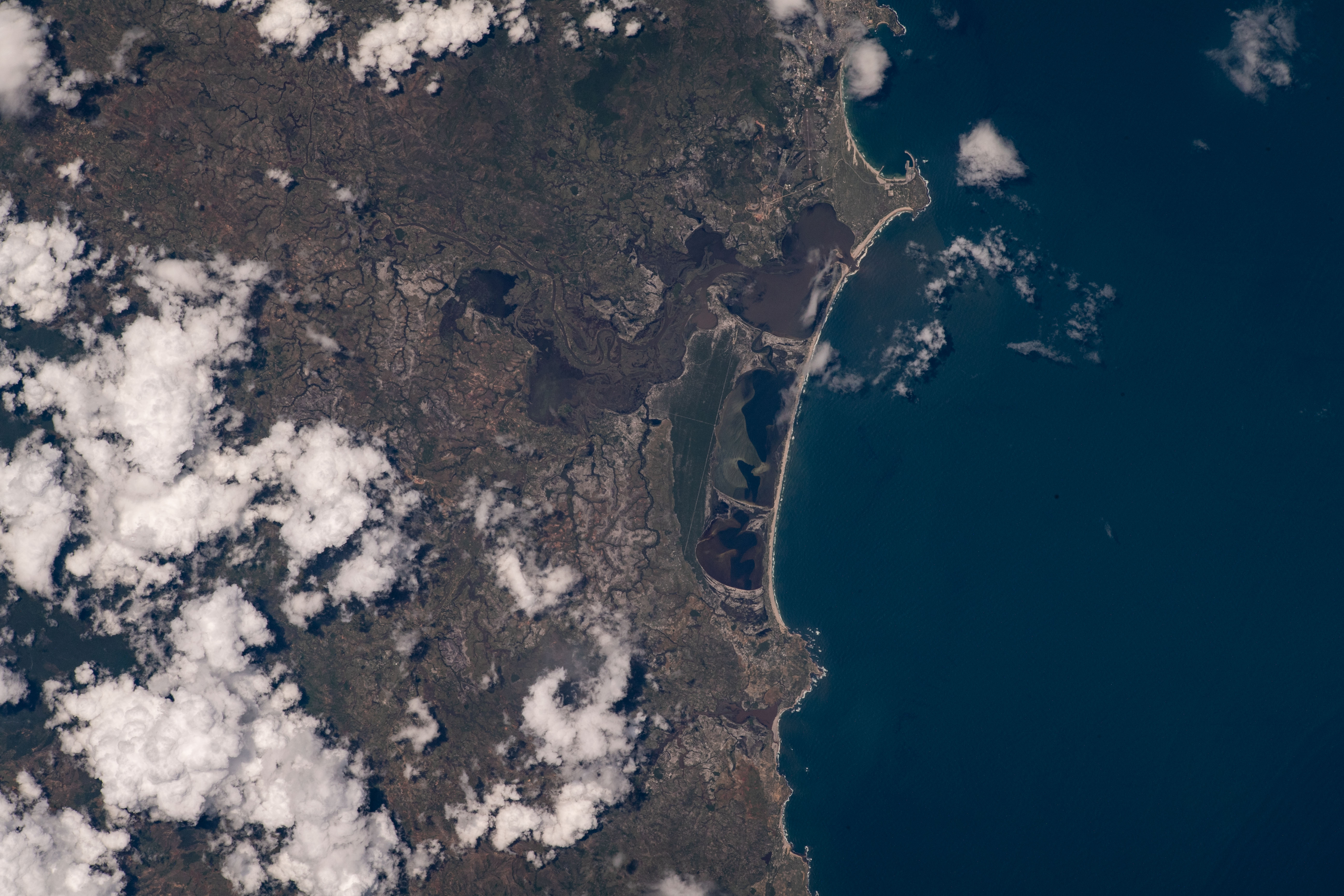
- Soanierana Ivongo from space

- Location in Madagascar
- Coordinates: 16°55′S 49°35′E
- Country: Madagascar
- Region: Analanjirofo
- District: Soanierana Ivongo

Area
  - Total: 203 km^{2} (78 sq mi)
- Elevation: 11 m (36 ft)

Population (2018)
  - Total: 26,990
  - Density: 148/km^{2} (380/sq mi)
- Time zone: UTC3 (EAT)
- Postal code: 516

Soanierana Ivongo is a rural municipality in Madagascar. It belongs to the district of Soanierana Ivongo, which is a part of Analanjirofo Region. The population of the commune was estimated to be approximately 26,990 in 2018.

Soanierana Ivongo Ville has a riverine harbour. In addition to primary schooling the town offers secondary education at both junior and senior levels. The town provides access to hospital services to its citizens. 24 fokontany (villages) are part of this municipality.

The majority 80% of the population of the commune are farmers. The most important crops are cloves and lychee, while other important agricultural products are coffee, rice and vanilla. Services provide employment for 15% of the population. Additionally fishing employs 5% of the population.

== Infrastructure ==
Soanierana Ivongo is found along the National Road No.5 from Toamasina (165 km) to Maroantsetra (227 km).

It is also the town where the ferry to Nosy Boraha (ile Sainte-Marie) leaves.

== Rivers ==
In its north the town is bordered by the Marimbona river.

== Nature ==
- Ambatovaky Reserve
