= Fenoarivo Atsinanana =

Fenoarivo Atsinanana Fénérive Est
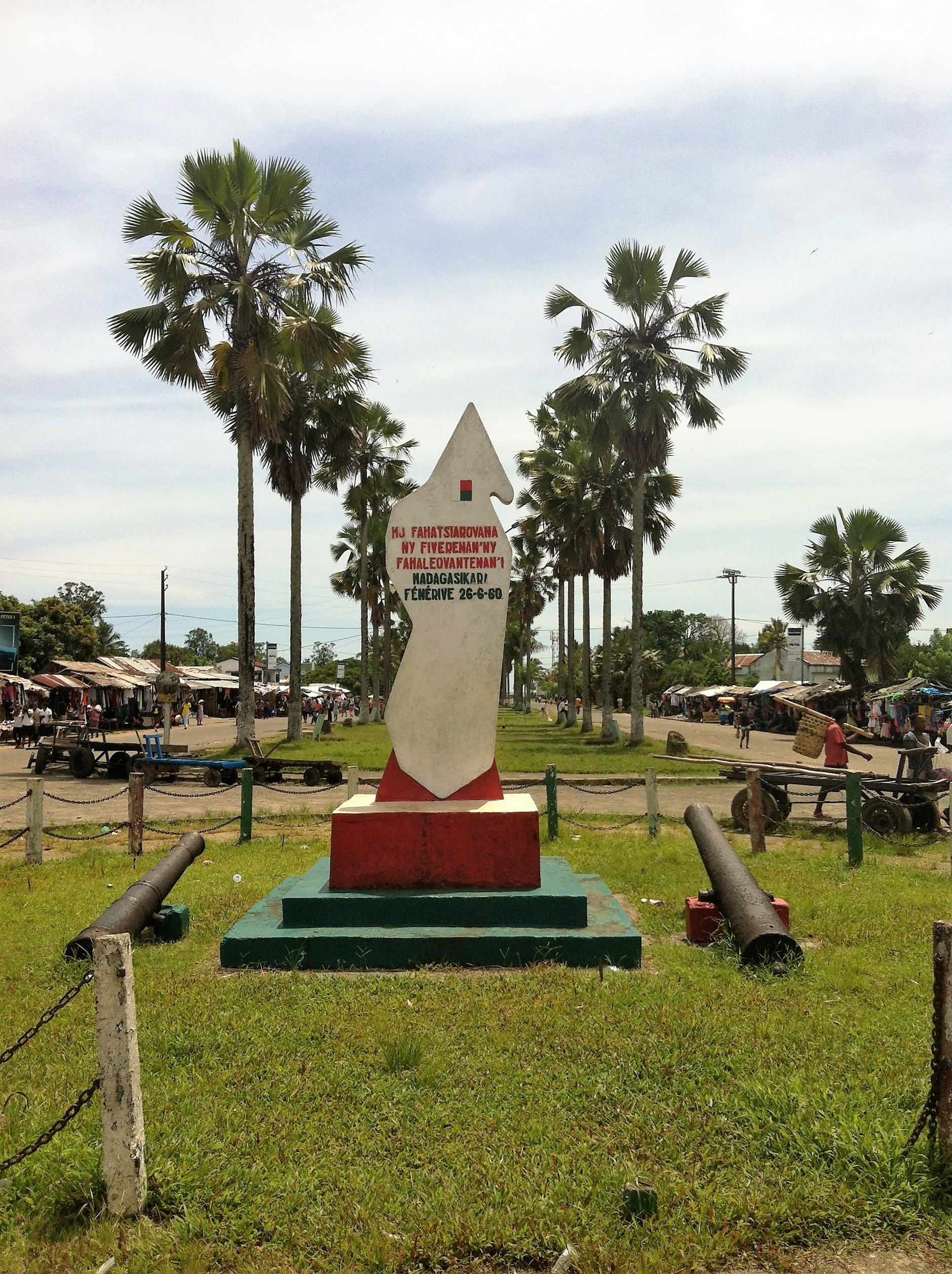
- Memorial plaque on Independence avenue

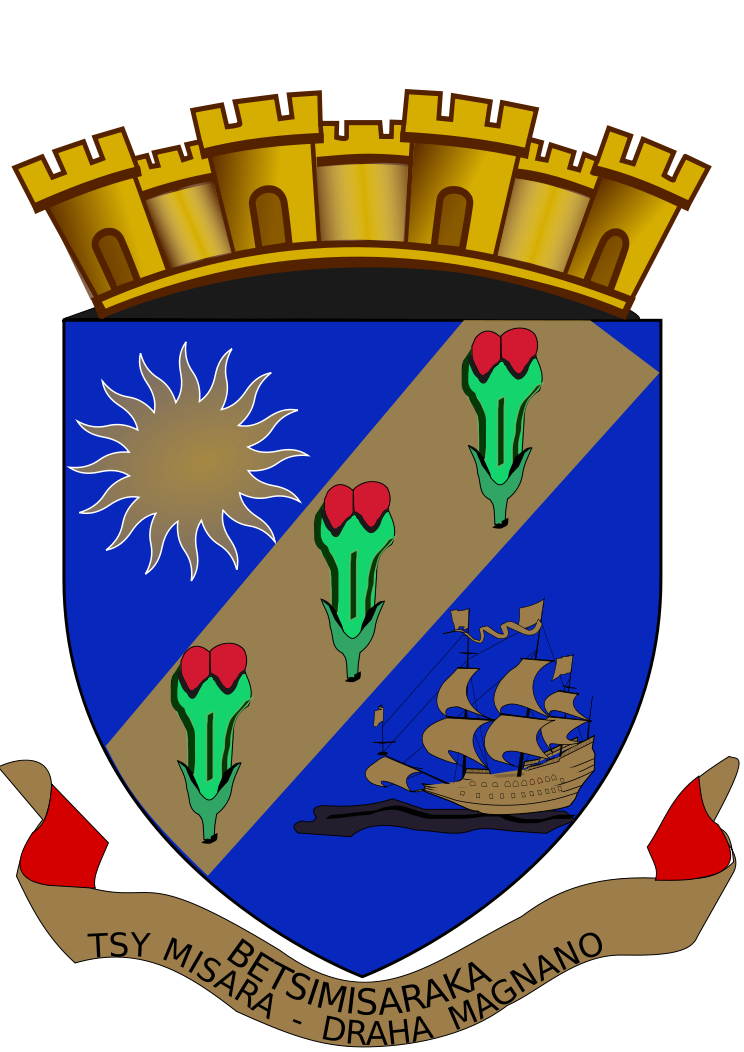
- Coat of arms

- Location in Madagascar
- Coordinates: 17°22′53″S 49°24′33″E
- Country: Madagascar
- Region: Analanjirofo

Area
  - Total: 22.9 km^{2} (8.8 sq mi)

Population (2018 census)
  - Total: 41,734
  - Density: 1,820/km^{2} (4,720/sq mi)
- Postal code: 509
- Climate: Af

Fenoarivo Atsinanana (French: Fénérive Est) is a city (commune urbaine) in Madagascar.

It is the capital of the Analanjirofo region and of the district of Fenerive-Est.

== Geography ==
It is situated at the East coast of Madagascar, about 103 km north of the city of Toamasina and 58 kms south of Soanierana-Ivongo along the National road 5 to Maroantsetra.

== Economy ==
The region around Fenoarivo is one of the most important clove growing areas of Madagascar. The city is also one of the most important sea resorts at the East coast.

== History ==
In the 17th century it was a privateer's harbour. Ratsimilaho, the first king of the Betsimisaraka, was the son of a pirate and a local princess. He is buried on the island Nosy Hely, a former pirate's stronghold that can be visited today (Vohimasina).

== Religion ==
- FJKM - Fiangonan'i Jesoa Kristy eto Madagasikara (Church of Jesus Christ in Madagascar)
- FLM - Fiangonana Loterana Malagasy (Malagasy Lutheran Church)
- Catholic Diocese (Cathedral of St. Maurice).

== Museums ==
The Lampy Museum.

== Gallery ==
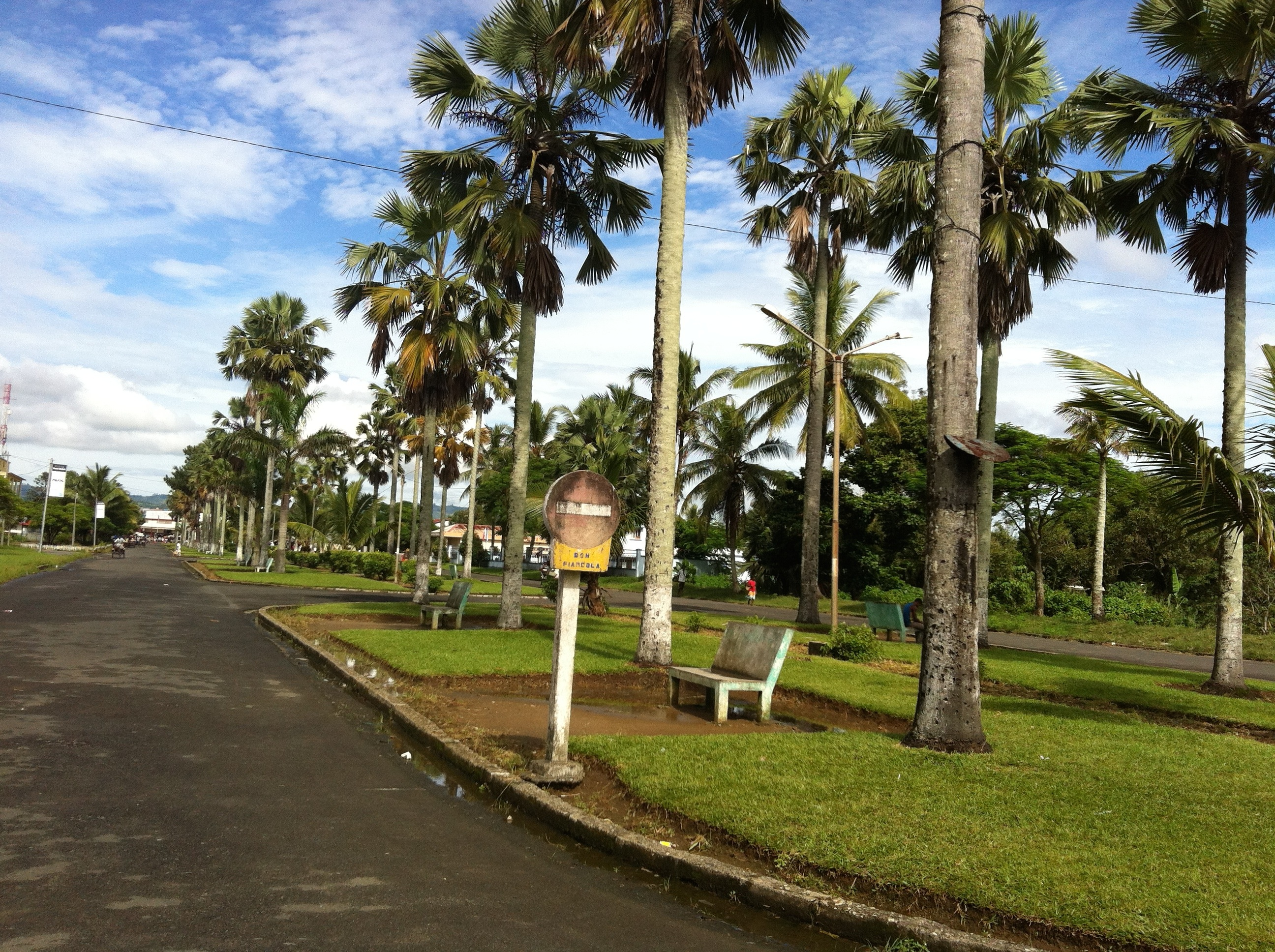
Independence avenue

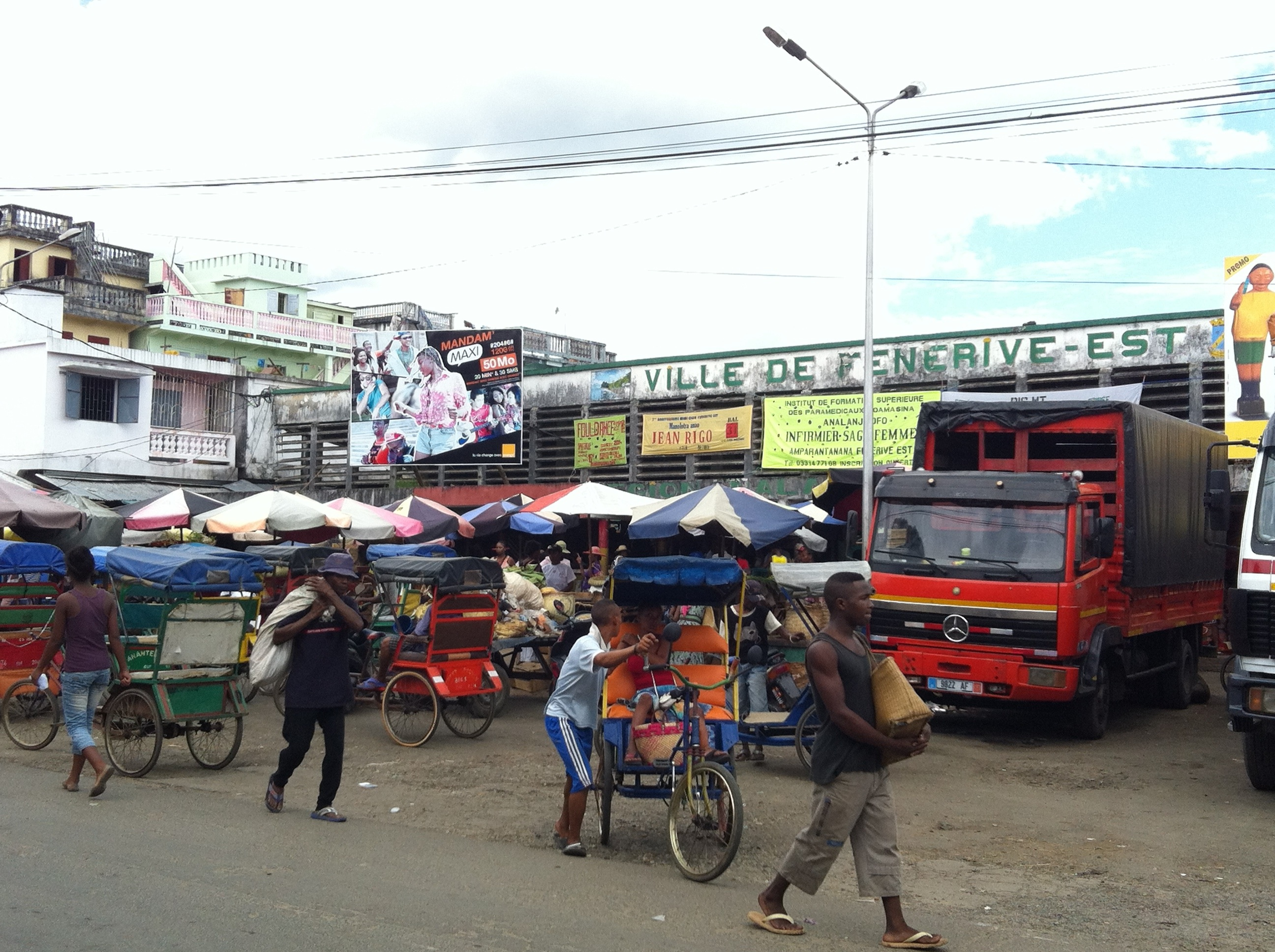
Public market

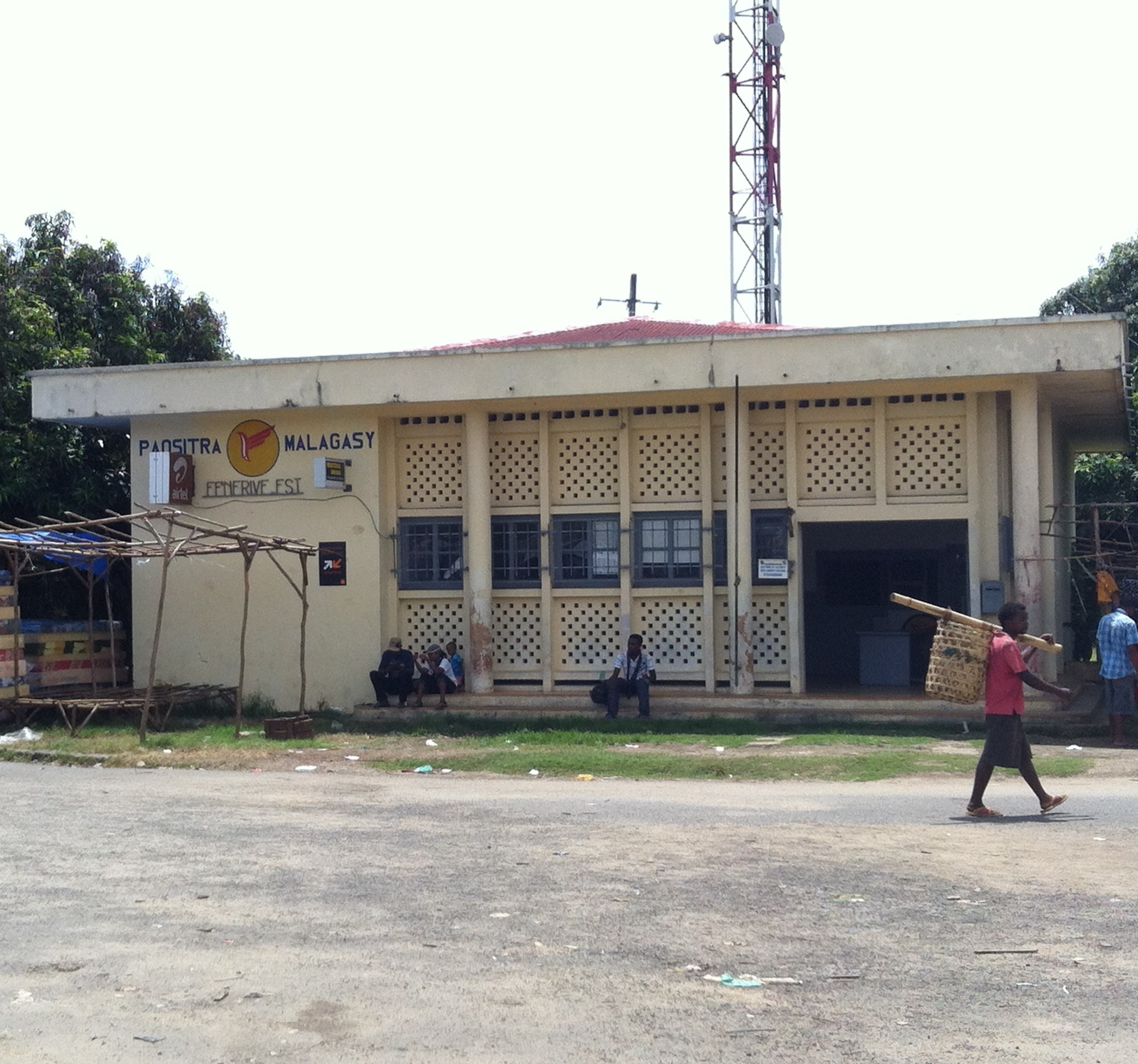
Post office

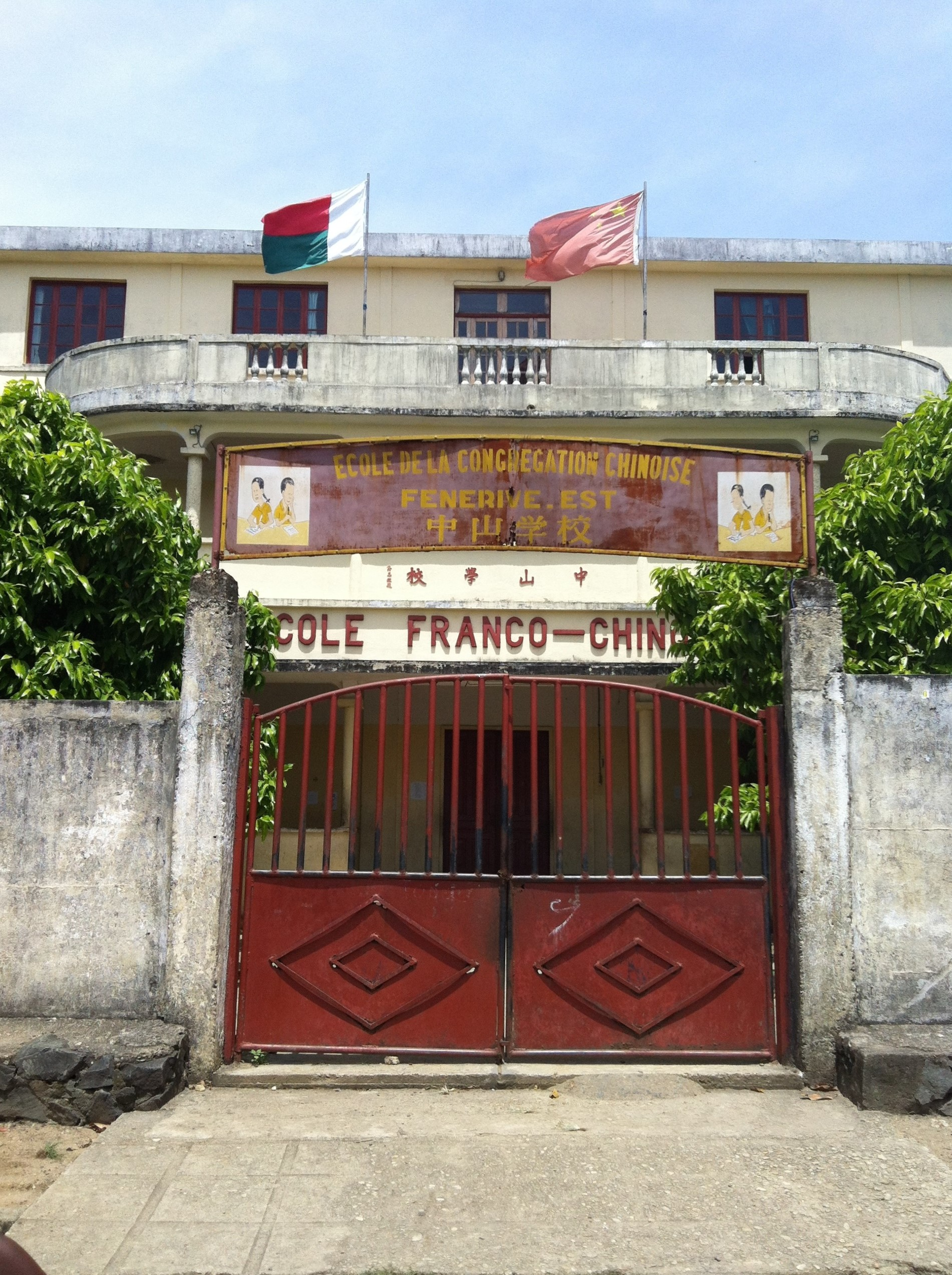
French-Chinese school

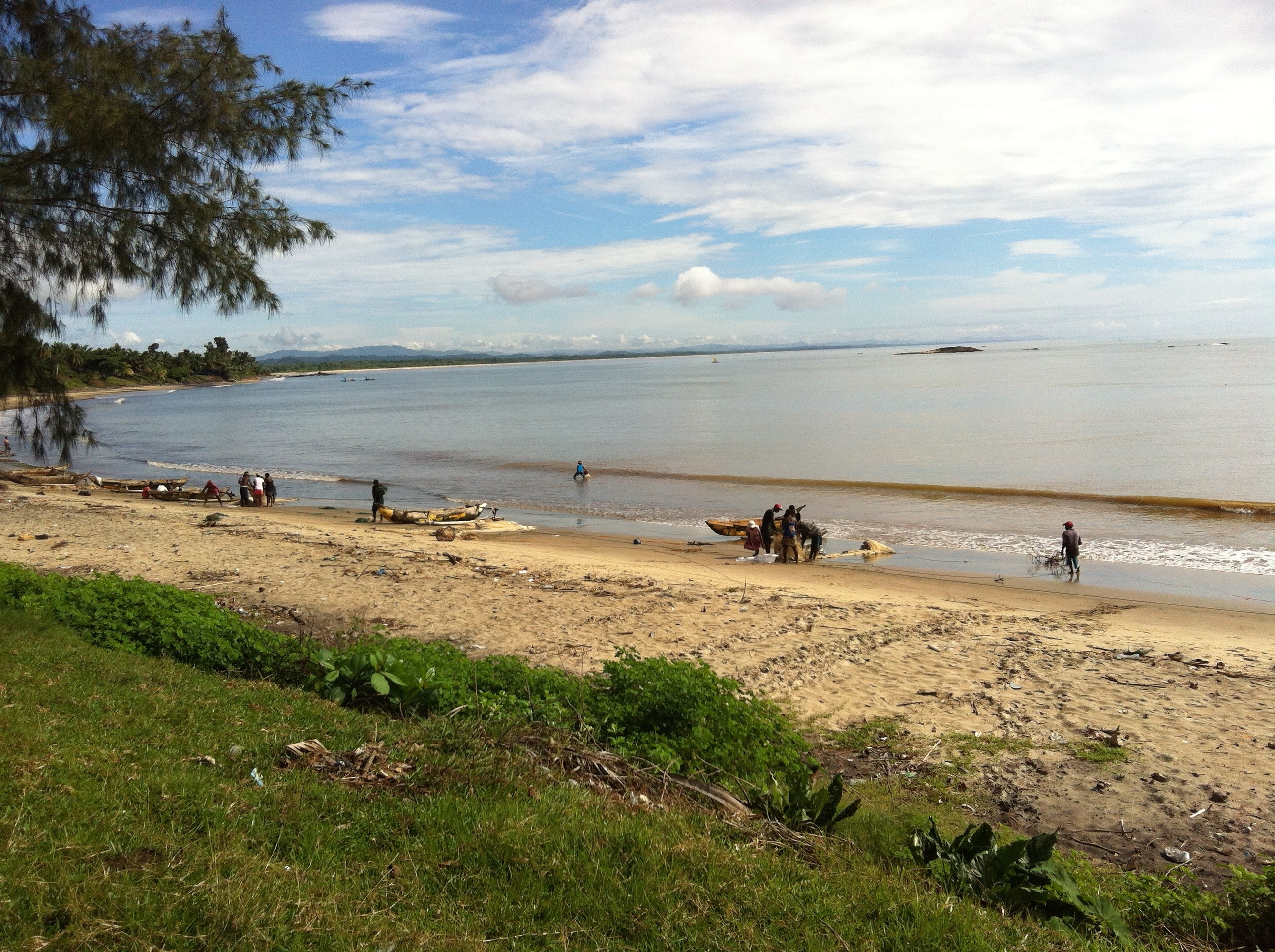
Fishermen
