= Montagne d'Ambre National Park =

National park in Antsiranana Province, Madagascar

- IUCN category II (national park)
- Location within Madagascar
- Location: Diana Region, Madagascar
- Nearest city: Antsiranana
- Coordinates: 12°35′42″S 49°09′18″E
- Area: 182 km^{2} (70 sq mi)
- Established: 28 October 1958
- Governing body: Madagascar National Parks (PNM-ANGAP)
- Website: https://www.parcs-madagascar.com/parcs/montagne%20d%20ambre.php

Montagne d'Ambre National Park is a national park in the Diana Region of northern Madagascar. The park is known for its endemic flora and fauna, water falls and crater lakes. It is 1,000 km (620 mi) north of the capital, Antananarivo, and is one of the most biologically diverse places in all of Madagascar with seventy-five species of birds, twenty-five species of mammals, and fifty-nine species of reptiles known to inhabit the park. The park is centred around Mount Ambohitra (Amber Mountain), the highest mountain in northern Madagascar.

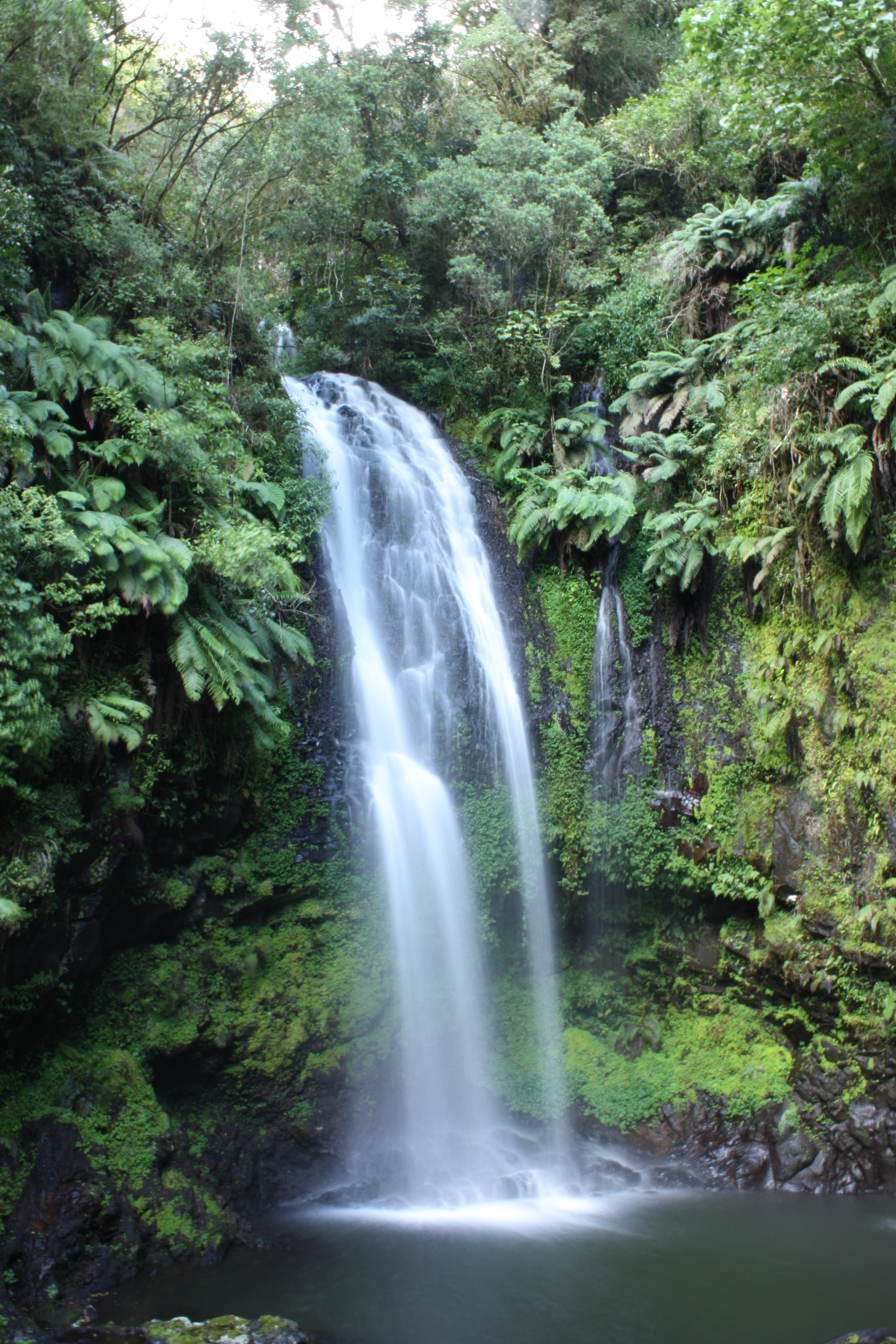
Waterfall in Amber Mountain National Park

== Geography ==
The park covers an area of 18,200 ha (45,000 acres) on an isolated volcanic massif, of mostly basaltic rock, above the surrounding dry region. Attractions include spectacular waterfalls and several crater lakes. There are numerous rivers and streams and the park is a water catchment area for the town of Antsiranana, which is surrounded by dry, sparse forests and semi-desert with succulent plants. Annual rainfall in the park is 3,585 mm (141.1 in) compared with 1,000 mm (39 in) around the town. The area is named after the deposits of copal, a soft form of amber.

Amber is one of the most accessible parks in northern Madagascar. Bush taxis travel to Joffreville daily from Antsiranana, taking about 45 minutes. On the trip up the mountain to the entrance of the park there are a few small villages and there is a lodge for guests at Joffreville. Living in and around the park are the Sakavala and Antankarana peoples.

== Flora and fauna ==
Most of the park is covered montane rainforest with trees up to 40 m (130 ft) tall and covered in lianas, orchids and ferns such as bird's-nest fern (Asplenium nidus). The forest is isolated from other rainforests by the surrounding dry forests. There are plantations of Eucalyptus and exotic conifers, pines, Araucaria and an invasive alien bush, Lantana camara. Over one thousand species of plants are recorded.

Of the twenty-five species of mammals in the park, local endemics include eight species of lemur, the ring-tailed mongoose (Galidia elegans) and the Malagasy civet (Fossa fossana). Thirty-five of the seventy-five species of birds are endemic including the Amber Mountain rock thrush (Monticola sharpei erythronotus) which is only known from one area on the Amber Mountain massif. The park is also known for its amphibians and reptiles such as the Amber Mountain leaf chameleon (Brookesia tuberculata), which is one of the smallest reptiles in the world. There are thirty-five species of frog.

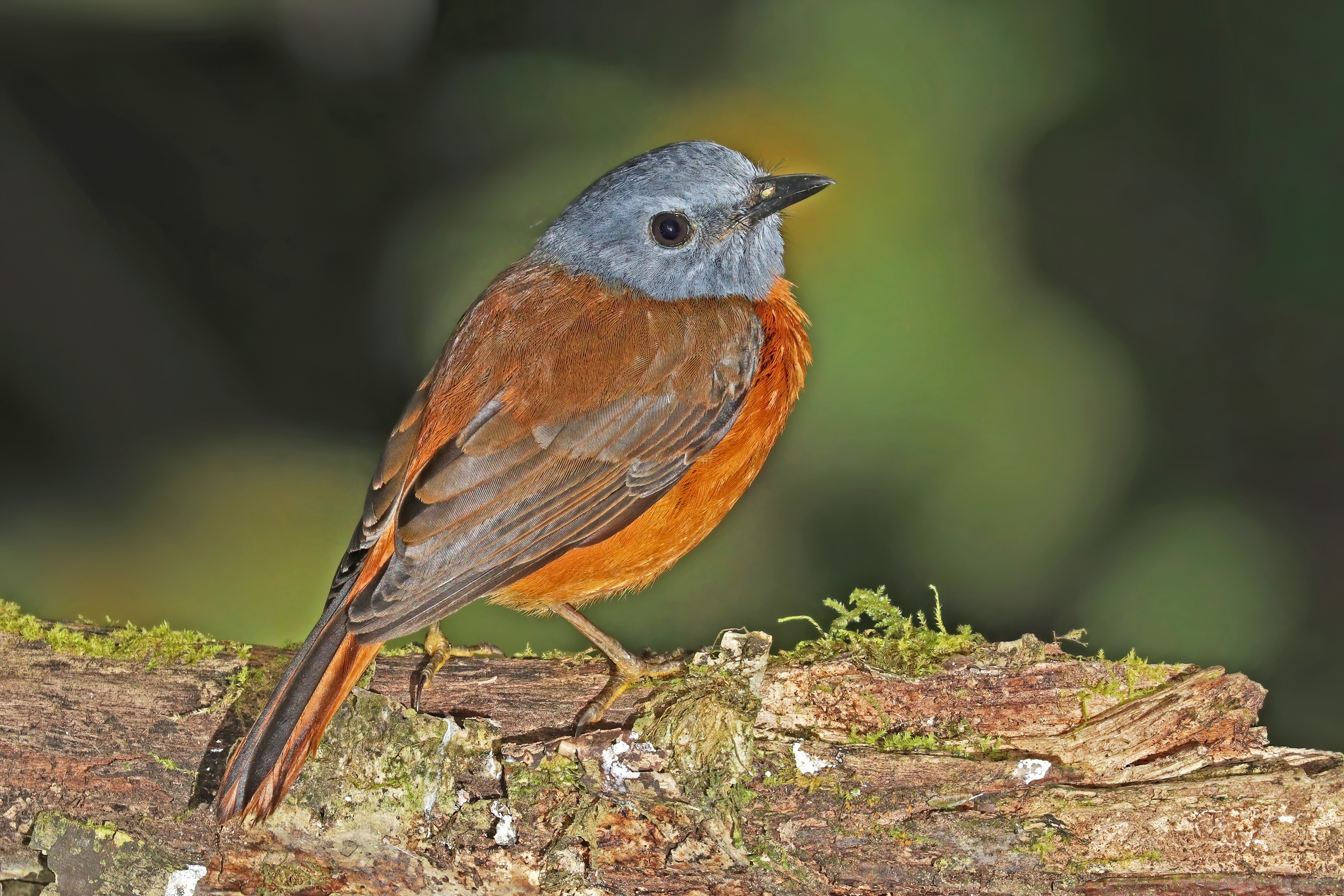
Amber mountain rock thrush, male

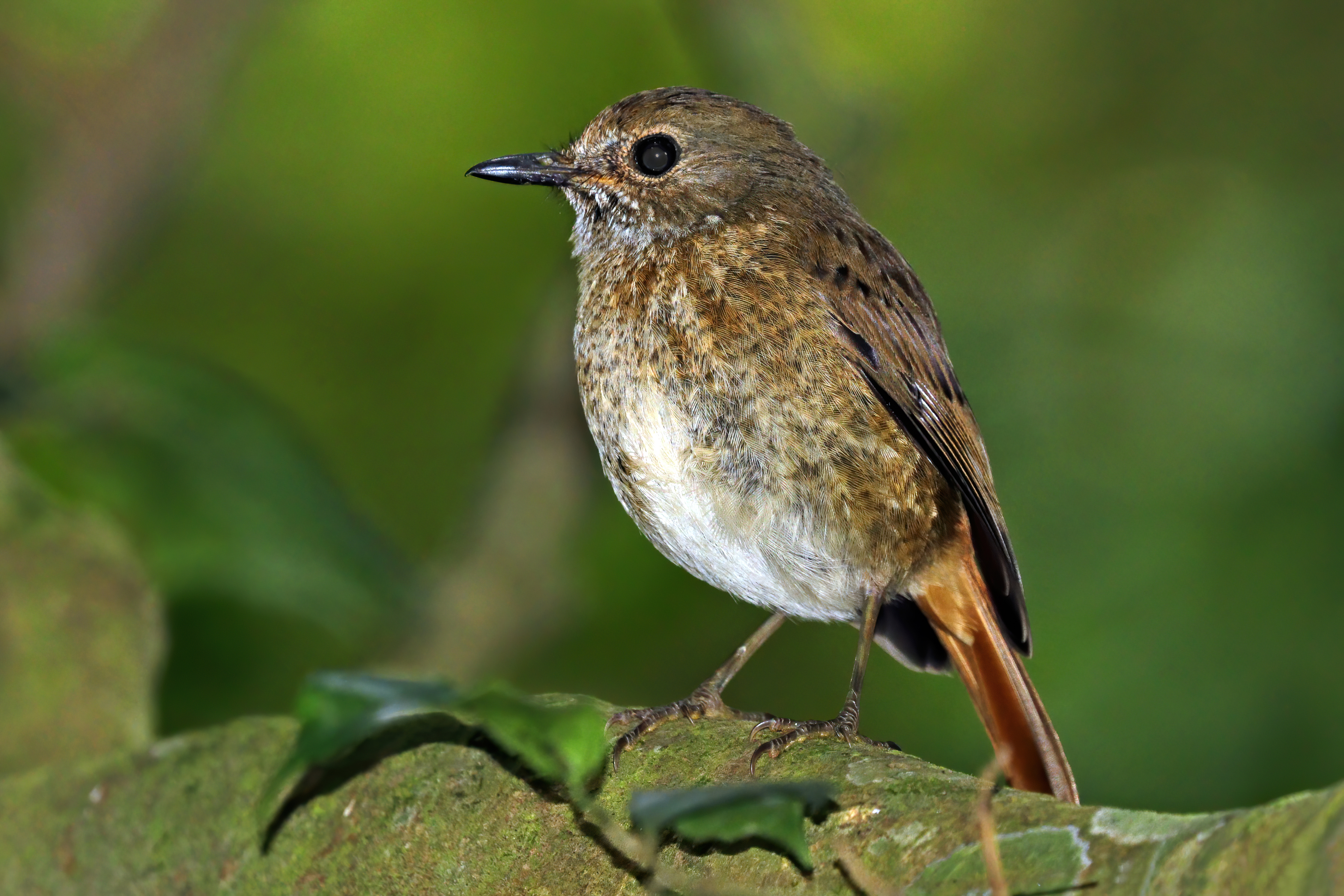
Amber mountain rock thrush, female

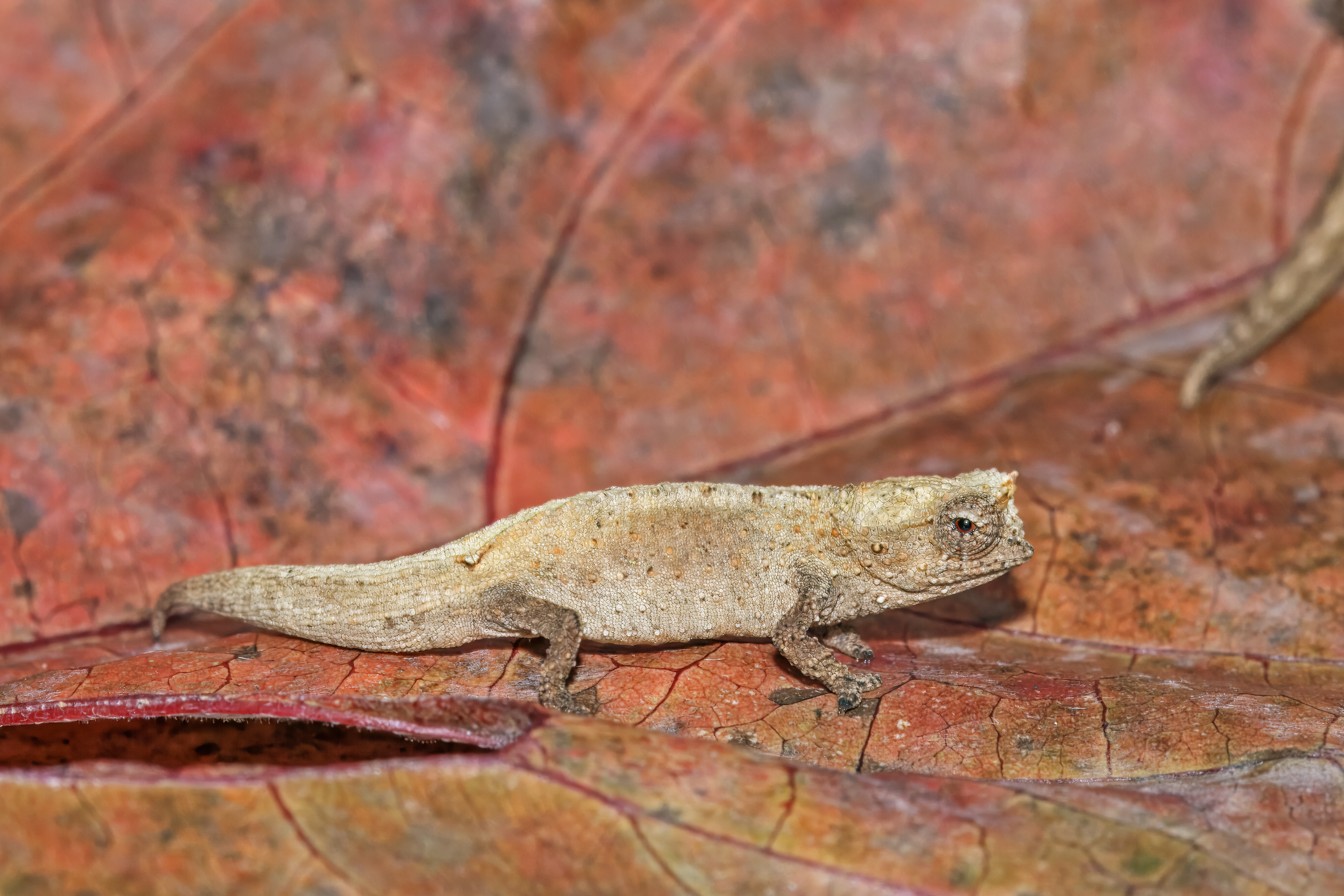
Montagne d'Ambre leaf chameleon, male

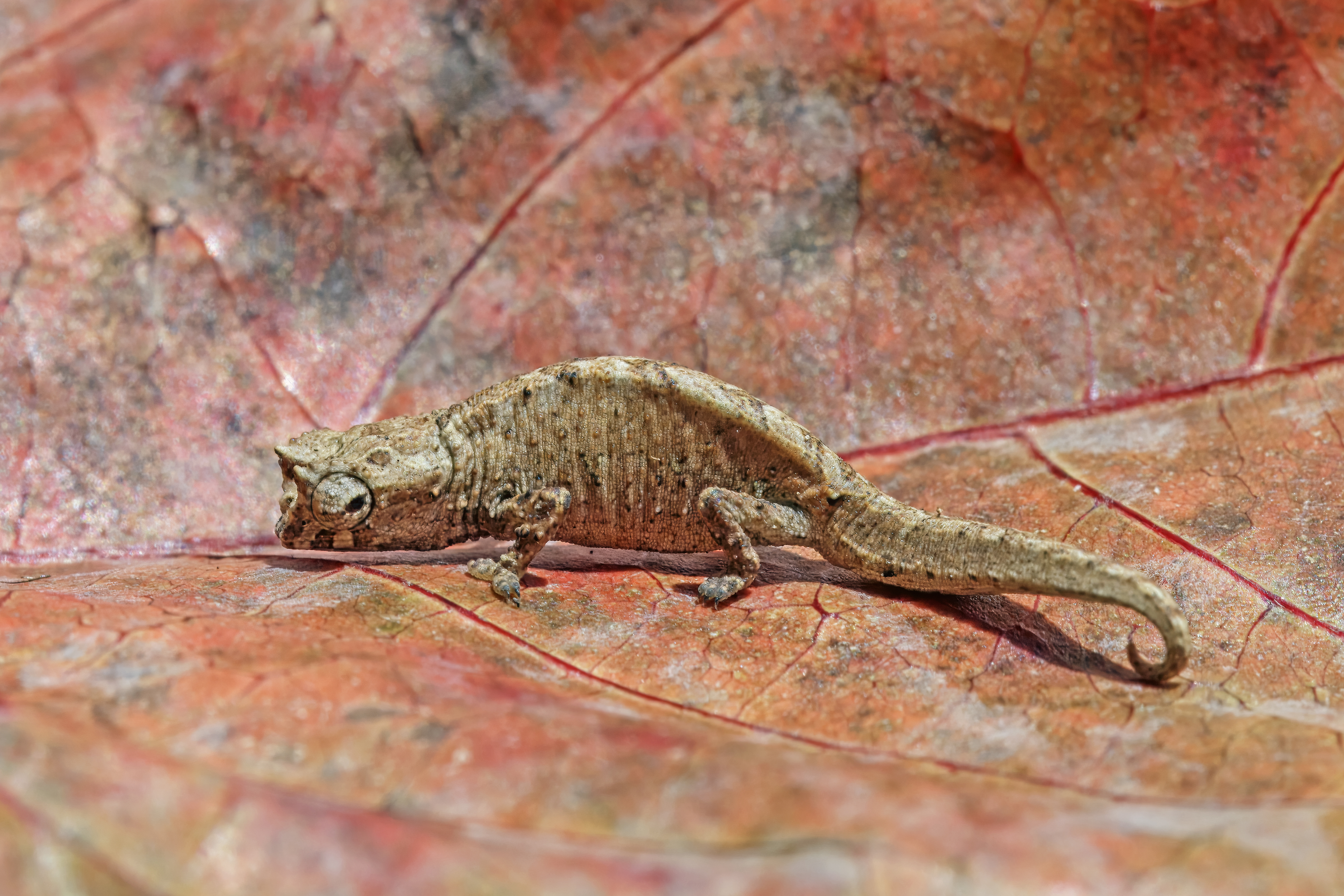
Montagne d'Ambre leaf chameleon, female

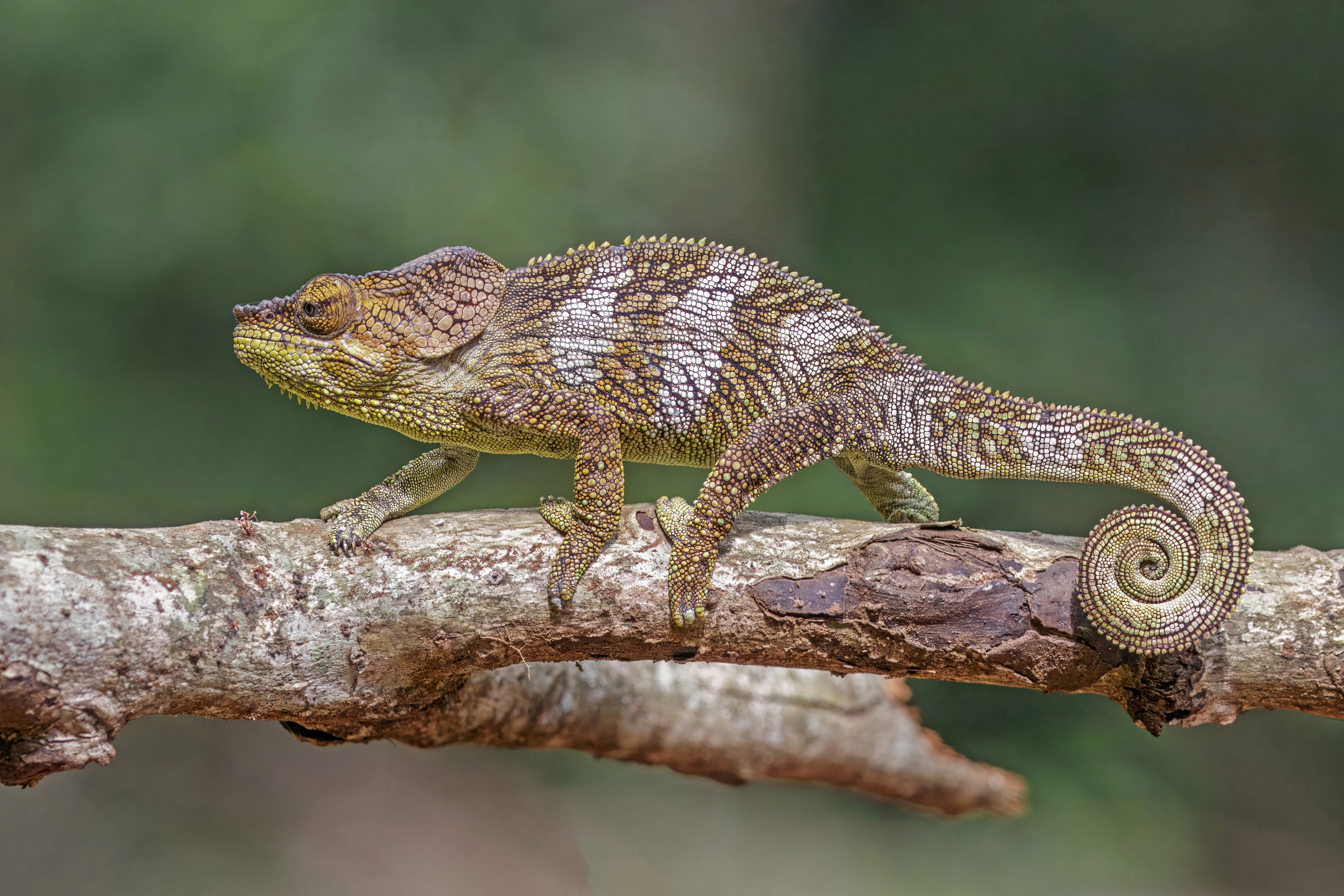
Amber Mountain chameleon, male

== See also ==
- List of national parks of Madagascar
- Amber Forest Reserve

== Sources ==
- Official website (in French)
- Wild Madagascar- Amber Mountain
