= Analanjirofo =

- Region
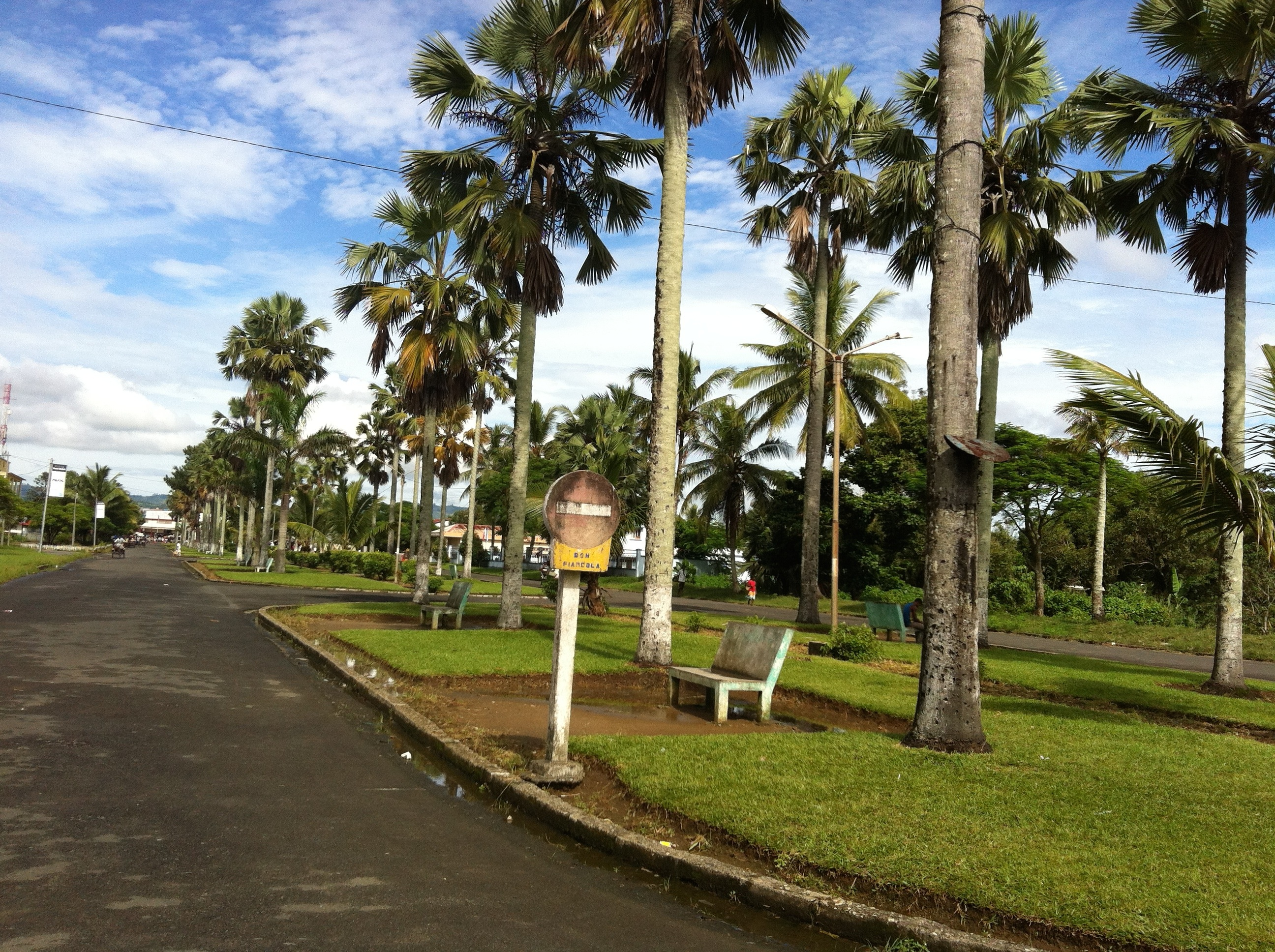
- in Fenerive Est

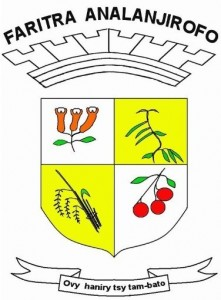
- Coat of arms

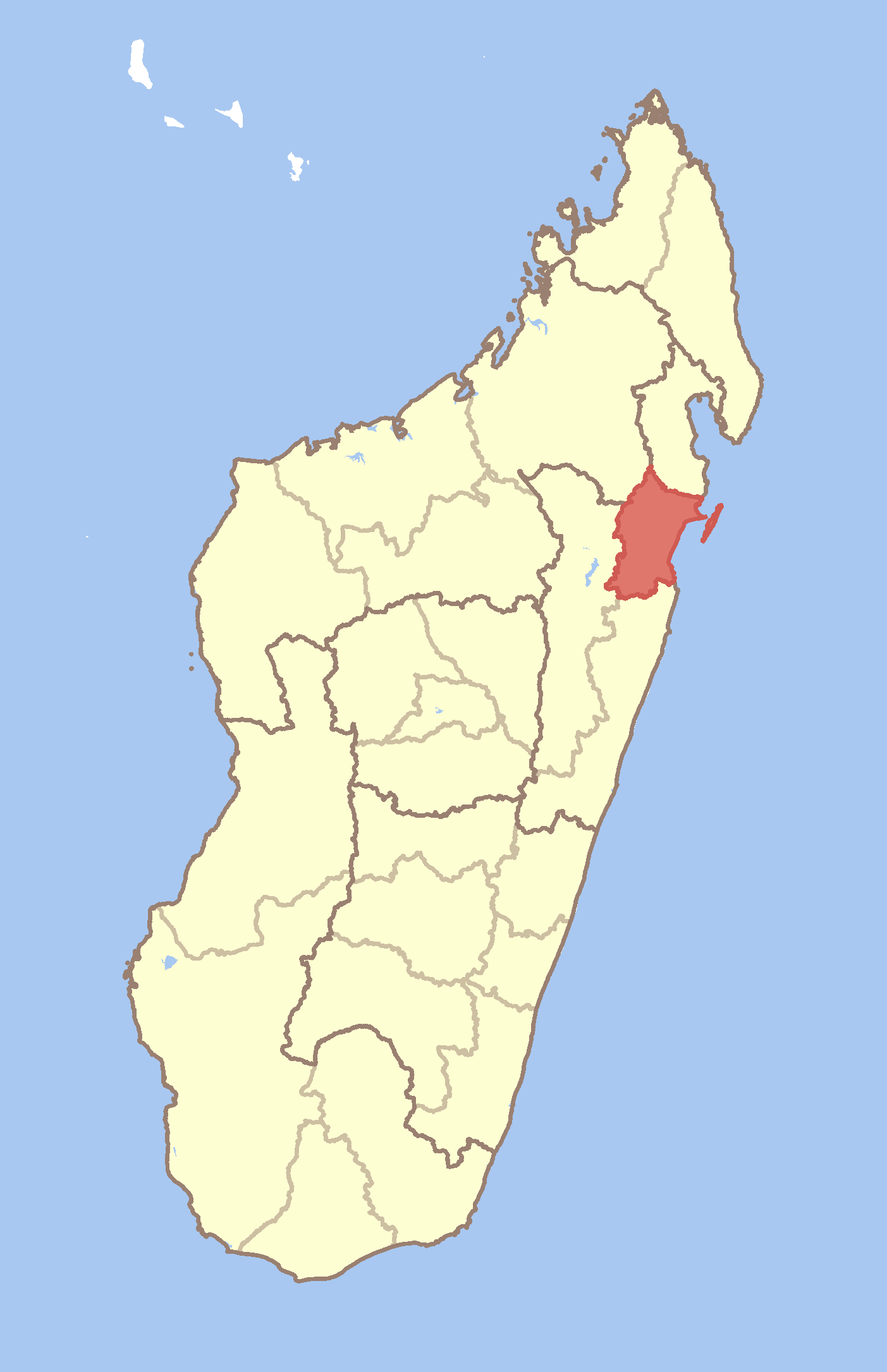
- Location of Analanjirofo in Madagascar
- Coordinates: 16°35′39″S 49°26′19″E
- Country: Madagascar
- Capital: Fenoarivo Atsinanana

Government
  - Governor: Marie Annick Bevazaha

Area
  - Total: 11,188 km^{2} (4,320 sq mi)

Population (2018 census)
  - Total: 1,152,345
- Includes the population of Ambatosoa, which was part of Analanjirofo until 2023.
- Time zone: UTC+3 (EAT)
- HDI (2018): 0.542 low · 4th of 22

Analanjirofo is a region in northeastern Madagascar. It is a part of Toamasina Province. It borders the regions of Ambatosoa to the north, Sofia to the west, Alaotra-Mangoro to the southwest and Atsinanana to the south.

The capital of the region is Fenoarivo Atsinanana (French: Fénérive Est). In 2023 the region of Ambatosoa was created from the districts of Mananara Avaratra and Maroantsetra in the northern part of Analanjirofo, although Ambatosoa was not officially inaugurated until 26 July 2025. Since the creation of Ambatosoa, the area of the four districts making up Analanjirofo is 11,188 square kilometres (4,320 sq mi).

== Administrative divisions ==
After the creation of Ambatosoa, Analanjirofo contains four districts, which are subdivided into 35 communes.

- Fenoarivo-Atsinanana District - 14 communes
- Nosy Boraha District - 1 commune
- Soanierana Ivongo District - 9 communes
- Vavatenina District - 11 communes

The population of Analanjirofo was 1,152,345 in 2018. This figure includes the populations of Mananara Avaratra and Maroantsetra that are now part of Ambatosoa. The 2018 population of the four districts that remain part of Analanjirofo was 659,012.

== Transport ==
=== Airports ===
- Maroantsetra Airport
- Nosy Boraha Airport

== Protected areas ==
- Part of Ankeniheny-Zahamena Corridor
- Tampolo New Protected Area
- Pointe-à-Larrée Special Reserve
- Part of Zahamena National Park
- Ambatovaky Reserve

== Rivers ==
From north to south, rivers in Analanjirofo include the Anove, Simianona, Marimbona, and Maningory rivers.

== See also ==
- Cyclone Herold
- Cyclone Ivan
