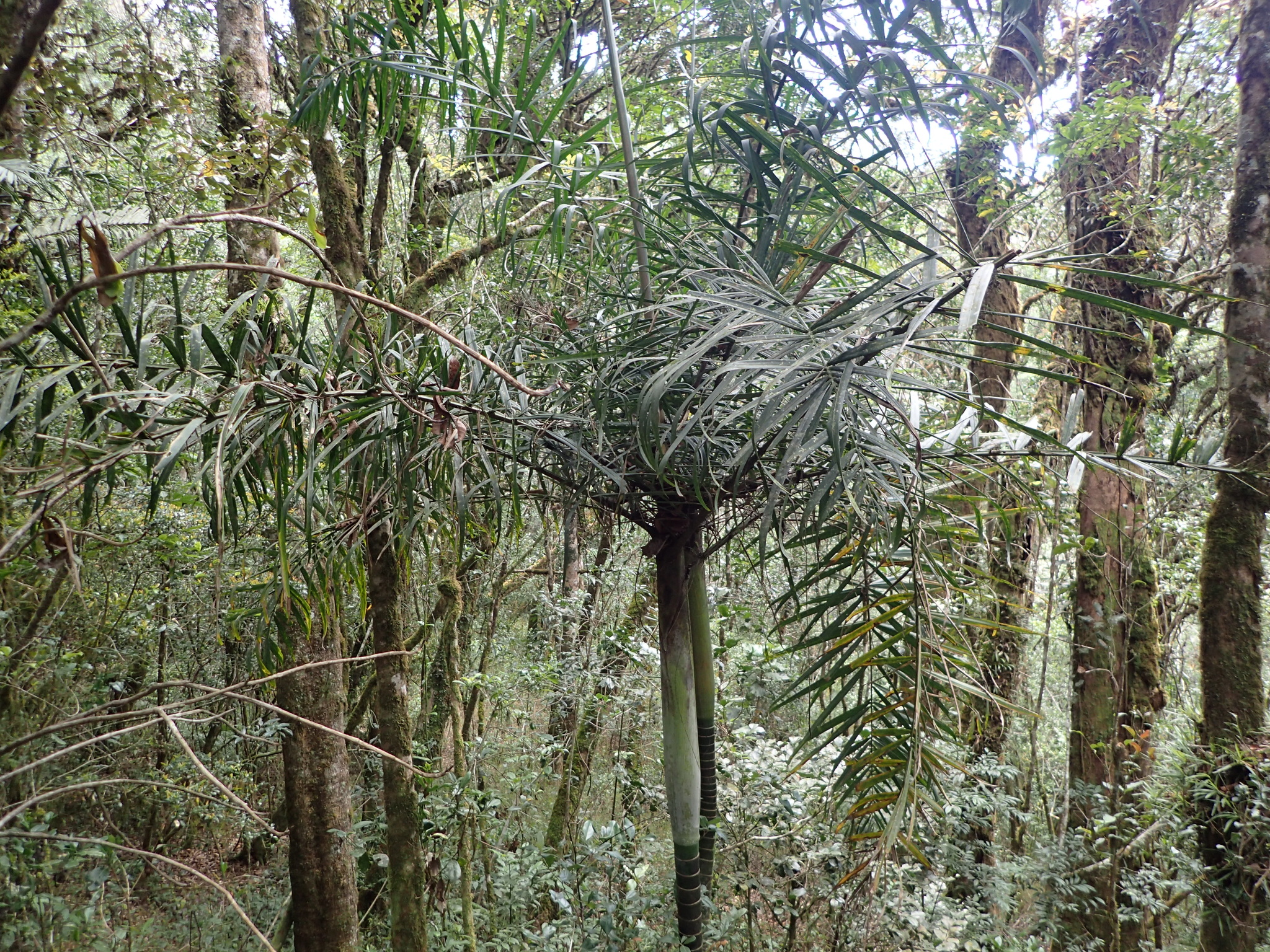
- Dypsis rivularis

Scientific classification
- Kingdom: Plantae
- Clade: Tracheophytes
- Clade: Angiosperms
- Clade: Monocots
- Clade: Commelinids
- Order: Arecales
- Family: Arecaceae
- Subfamily: Arecoideae
- Tribe: Areceae
- Subtribe: Dypsidinae
- Genus: Dypsis; Noronha ex Mart.

Synonyms
- Adelodypsis Becc.; Drypsis Duch.; Dypsidium Baill.; Haplodypsis Baill.; Haplophloga Baill.; Neophloga Baill.; Phloga Noronha ex Hook.f.; Trichodypsis Baill.

= Dypsis =

Genus of palms

Dypsis is a genus of flowering plants in the family Arecaceae. They are slender, evergreen palms with yellow flowers carried in panicles amongst the pinnate leaves. Many Dypsis species have aerial branching (above the main trunk), a rare growth habit among palms. Some have marcescent leaves that remain attached after death and trap litter for nutrients. Several species previously placed here have been returned to the restored genera Chrysalidocarpus (including the type species Chrysalidocarpus lutescens) and Vonitra.

== Etymology ==
The etymology is obscure but may be related to the Greek dypto 'I dive' or dyptes 'diver'. The species are native to Tanzania, Madagascar, and various islands in the Indian Ocean (Mauritius and Comoros). A few are naturalized in other regions, especially in the Caribbean.

== Species ==
As of February 2026, Plants of the World Online accepts the following 107 species:

- Dypsis acaulis J.Dransf.
- Dypsis ambilaensis J.Dransf.
- Dypsis andapae Beentje
- Dypsis andilamenensis Rakotoarin. & J.Dransf.
- Dypsis angusta Jum.
- Dypsis angustifolia (H.Perrier) Beentje & J.Dransf.
- Dypsis anjae Rakotoarin. & J.Dransf.
- Dypsis aquatilis Beentje
- Dypsis aurantiaca Eiserhardt & Rakotoarin.
- Dypsis beentjei J.Dransf.
- Dypsis bernieriana (Baill.) Beentje & J.Dransf.
- Dypsis betamponensis (Jum.) Beentje & J.Dransf.
- Dypsis betsimisarakae Rakotoarin. & J.Dransf.
- Dypsis boiviniana Baill.
- Dypsis bonsai Beentje
- Dypsis bosseri J.Dransf.
- Dypsis brevicaulis (Guillaumet) Beentje & J.Dransf.
- Dypsis brittiana Rakotoarin.
- Dypsis catatiana (Baill.) Beentje & J.Dransf.
- Dypsis caudata Beentje
- Dypsis commersoniana (Baill.) Beentje & J.Dransf.
- Dypsis concinna Baker
- Dypsis confusa Beentje
- Dypsis cookei J.Dransf.
- Dypsis coriacea Beentje
- Dypsis corniculata (Becc.) Beentje & J.Dransf.
- Dypsis coursii Beentje
- Dypsis culminis Rakotoarin. & J.Dransf.
- Dypsis curtisii Baker
- Dypsis delicatula Britt & J.Dransf.
- Dypsis digitata (Becc.) Beentje & J.Dransf.
- Dypsis dracaenoides Rakotoarin. & J.Dransf.
- Dypsis elegans Beentje
- Dypsis eriostachys J.Dransf.
- Dypsis faneva Beentje
- Dypsis fanjana Beentje
- Dypsis fasciculata Jum.
- Dypsis forficifolia Noronha ex Mart.
- Dypsis furcata J.Dransf.
- Dypsis gautieri Rakotoarin. & J.Dransf.
- Dypsis glabrescens (Becc.) Becc.
- Dypsis gronophyllum Rakotoarin. & J.Dransf.
- Dypsis henrici J.Dransf., Beentje & Govaerts
- Dypsis heterophylla Baker
- Dypsis hiarakae Beentje
- Dypsis hildebrandtii (Baill.) Becc.
- Dypsis humbertii H.Perrier
- Dypsis humilis M.S.Trudgen, Rakotoarin. & W.J.Baker
- Dypsis integra (Jum.) Beentje & J.Dransf.
- Dypsis intermedia Beentje
- Dypsis interrupta J.Dransf.
- Dypsis jeremiei Rakotoarin. & J.Dransf.
- Dypsis jumelleana Beentje & J.Dransf.
- Dypsis laevis J.Dransf.
- Dypsis lantzeana Baill.
- Dypsis lanuginosa J.Dransf.
- Dypsis lilacina J.Dransf. & Rakotoarin.
- Dypsis linearis Jum.
- Dypsis lokohoensis J.Dransf.
- Dypsis louvelii Jum. & H.Perrier
- Dypsis lucens (Jum.) Beentje & J.Dransf.
- Dypsis lutea (Jum.) Beentje & J.Dransf.
- Dypsis mahia Beentje
- Dypsis makirae Rakotoarin. & Britt
- Dypsis mangorensis (Jum.) Beentje & J.Dransf.
- Dypsis marojejyi Beentje
- Dypsis mcdonaldiana Beentje
- Dypsis metallica Rakotoarin. & J.Dransf.
- Dypsis minuta Beentje
- Dypsis mirabilis J.Dransf.
- Dypsis mocquerysiana (Becc.) Becc.
- Dypsis monostachya Jum.
- Dypsis montana (Jum.) Beentje & J.Dransf.
- Dypsis nodifera Mart.
- Dypsis occidentalis (Jum.) Beentje & J.Dransf.
- Dypsis pachyramea J.Dransf.
- Dypsis paludosa J.Dransf.
- Dypsis pervillei (Baill.) Beentje & J.Dransf.
- Dypsis pinnatifrons Mart.
- Dypsis plurisecta Jum.
- Dypsis poivreana (Baill.) Beentje & J.Dransf.
- Dypsis procera Jum.
- Dypsis procumbens (Jum. & H.Perrier) J.Dransf., Beentje & Govaerts
- Dypsis pulchella J.Dransf.
- Dypsis pustulata J.Dransf. & Rakotoarin.
- Dypsis rakotonasoloi Rakotoarin.
- Dypsis ramentacea J.Dransf.
- Dypsis reflexa Rakotoarin. & J.Dransf.
- Dypsis remotiflora J.Dransf.
- Dypsis rivularis (Jum. & H.Perrier) Beentje & J.Dransf.
- Dypsis rosea J.Dransf., Hodel & Marcus
- Dypsis sahanofensis (Jum. & H.Perrier) Beentje & J.Dransf.
- Dypsis sancta Rakotoarin. & J.Dransf.
- Dypsis scandens J.Dransf.
- Dypsis schatzii Beentje
- Dypsis scottiana (Becc.) Beentje & J.Dransf.
- Dypsis simianensis (Jum.) Beentje & J.Dransf.
- Dypsis singularis Beentje
- Dypsis soanieranae Beentje
- Dypsis spicata J.Dransf.
- Dypsis subacaulis J.Dransf. & Rakotoarin.
- Dypsis tenuissima Beentje
- Dypsis thermarum J.Dransf.
- Dypsis thiryana (Becc.) Beentje & J.Dransf.
- Dypsis trapezoidea J.Dransf.
- Dypsis turkii J.Dransf.
- Dypsis viridis Jum.

=== Moved to restored genus Chrysalidocarpus ===
- Chrysalidocarpus ambanjae (Beentje) Eiserhardt & W.J.Baker (as D. ambanjae Beentje)
- Chrysalidocarpus ambositrae (Beentje) Eiserhardt & W.J.Baker (as D. ambositrae Beentje)
- Chrysalidocarpus andrianatonga (Beentje) Eiserhardt & W.J.Baker (as D. andrianatonga Beentje)
- Chrysalidocarpus ankirindro (W.J.Baker, Rakotoarin. & M.S.Trudgen) Eiserhardt & W.J.Baker (as D. ankirindro W.J.Baker, Rakotoarin. & M.S.Trudgen)
- Chrysalidocarpus arenarum Jum. (as D. arenarum (Jum.) Beentje & J.Dransf.)
- Chrysalidocarpus baronii Becc. (as D. baronii (Becc.) Beentje & J.Dransf.)
- Chrysalidocarpus basilongus (Jum. & H.Perrier) Eiserhardt & W.J.Baker (as D. basilonga (Jum. & H.Perrier) Beentje & J.Dransf.)
- Chrysalidocarpus bejofo (Beentje) Eiserhardt & W.J.Baker (as D. befojo Beentje)
- Chrysalidocarpus canaliculatus ((Jum.) Eiserhardt & W.J.Baker (as D. canaliculata (Jum.) Beentje & J.Dransf.)
- Chrysalidocarpus canescens Jum. & H.Perrier (as D. canescens (Jum. & H.Perrier) Beentje & J.Dransf.)
- Chrysalidocarpus carlsmithii (J.Dransf. & Marcus) Eiserhardt & W.J.Baker (as D. carlsmithii J.Dransf. & Marcus)
- Chrysalidocarpus ceraceus (Jum.) Eiserhardt & W.J.Baker (as D. ceracea (Jum.) Beentje & J.Dransf.)
- Chrysalidocarpus decaryi (Jum.) Eiserhardt & W.J.Baker (as D. decaryi (Jum.) Beentje & J.Dransf.)
- Chrysalidocarpus decipiens Becc. (as D. decipiens (Becc.) Beentje & J.Dransf.)
- Chrysalidocarpus gracilis (Jum.) Eiserhardt & W.J.Baker (as D. oreophila Beentje)
- Chrysalidocarpus heteromorphus (Jum.) Eiserhardt & W.J.Baker (as D. heteromorpha (Jum.) Beentje & J.Dransf.)
- Chrysalidocarpus hovomantsina (Beentje) Eiserhardt & W.J.Baker (as D. hovomantsina Beentje)
- Chrysalidocarpus ifanadianae (Beentje) Eiserhardt & W.J.Baker (as D. ifanadianae Beentje)
- Chrysalidocarpus lanceolatus Becc. (as D. lanceolata Beentje & J.Dransf.)
- Chrysalidocarpus ligulatus (Jum.) Eiserhardt & W.J.Baker (as D. ligulata (Jum.) Beentje & J.Dransf.)
- Chrysalidocarpus loucoubensis (Jum.) Eiserhardt & W.J.Baker (as D. ampasindavae Beentje)
- Chrysalidocarpus lutescens H.Wendl. (as D. lutescens (H.Wendl.) Beentje & J.Dransf.)
- Chrysalidocarpus madagascariensis (D.T.Fish) Becc. ( as D. madagascariensis D.T.Fish)
- Chrysalidocarpus malcomberi (Beentje) Eiserhardt & W.J.Baker (as D. malcomberi Beentje)
- Chrysalidocarpus mananjarensis Jum. & H.Perrier (as D. mananjarensis (Jum. & H.Perrier) Beentje & J.Dransf.)
- Chrysalidocarpus nauseosus (Jum. & H.Perrier) Eiserhardt & W.J.Baker (as D. nauseosa (Jum. & H.Perrier) Beentje & J.Dransf.)
- Chrysalidocarpus onilahensis Jum. & H.Perrier (as D. onilahensis (Jum. & H.Perrier) Beentje & J.Dransf.)
- Chrysalidocarpus oropedionis (Beentje) Eiserhardt & W.J.Baker (as D. oropedionis Beentje)
- Chrysalidocarpus ovobontsira (Beentje) Eiserhardt & W.J.Baker (as D. ovobontsira Beentje)
- Chrysalidocarpus pembanus H.E.Moore (as D. pembana (H.E.Moore) Beentje & J.Dransf.)
- Chrysalidocarpus piluliferus Becc. (as D. pilulifera (Becc.) Beentje & J.Dransf.)
- Chrysalidocarpus prestonianus (Beentje) Eiserhardt & W.J.Baker (as D. prestoniana Beentje)
- Chrysalidocarpus psammophilus (Beentje) Eiserhardt & W.J.Baker (as D. psammophila Beentje)
- Chrysalidocarpus saintelucei (Beentje) Eiserhardt & W.J.Baker (as D. saintelucei Beentje)
- Chrysalidocarpus serpentinus (Beentje) Eiserhardt & W.J.Baker (as D. serpentina Beentje)
- Chrysalidocarpus tsaratananensis (Jum.) Eiserhardt & W.J.Baker (as D. tsaratananensis (Jum.) Beentje & J.Dransf.)
- Chrysalidocarpus tsaravoasira (Beentje) Eiserhardt & W.J.Baker (as D. tsaravoasira Beentje)

=== Moved to genus Vonitra ===
- Vonitra antanambensis (Beentje) Eiserhardt & W.J.Baker (as D. antanambensis Beentje)
- Vonitra crinita Jum. & H.Perrier (as D. crinita (Jum. & H.Perrier) Beentje & J.Dransf.)
- Vonitra dransfieldii (Beentje) Eiserhardt & W.J.Baker (as D. dransfieldii Beentje)
- Vonitra nossibensis (Becc.) H.Perrier (as D. nossibensis (Becc.) Beentje & J.Dransf.)
- Vonitra perrieri (Jum.) Eiserhardt & W.J.Baker (as D. perrieri (Jum.) Beentje & J.Dransf. )
- Vonitra utilis Jum. (as D. utilis (Jum.) Beentje & J.Dransf.)

== Gallery ==
=== Accepted species ===
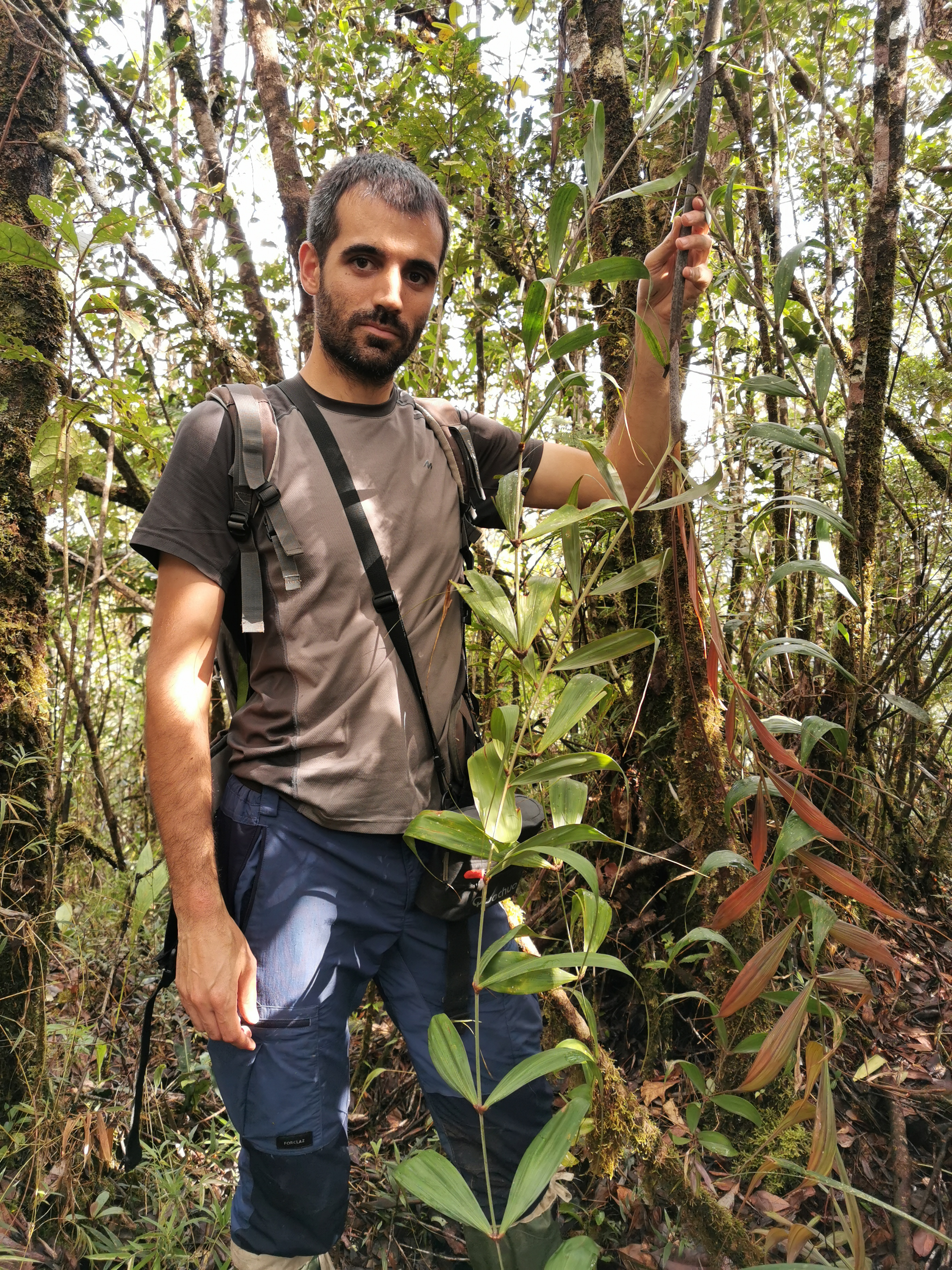
Dypsis andilamenensis

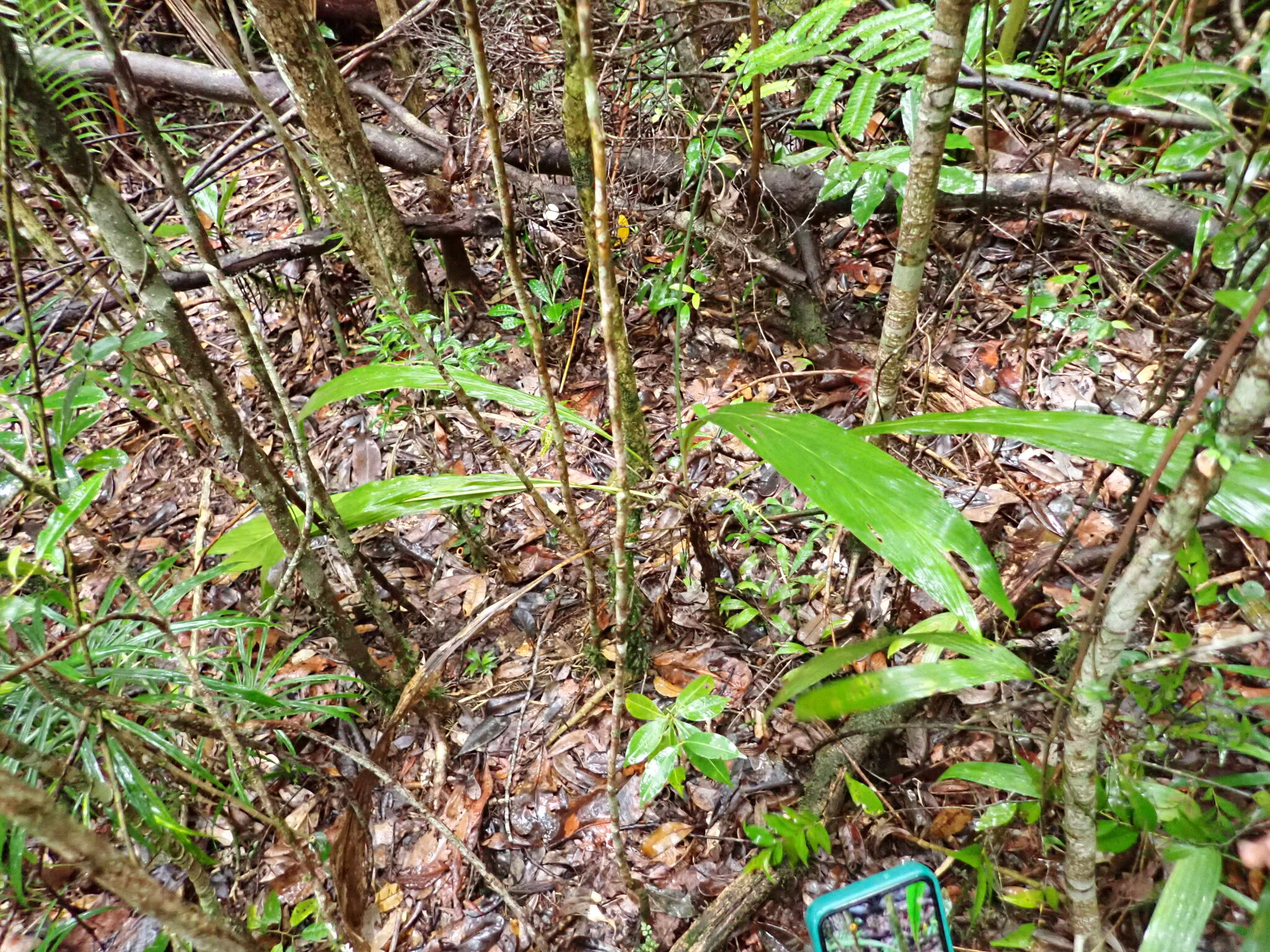
Dypsis brevicaulis

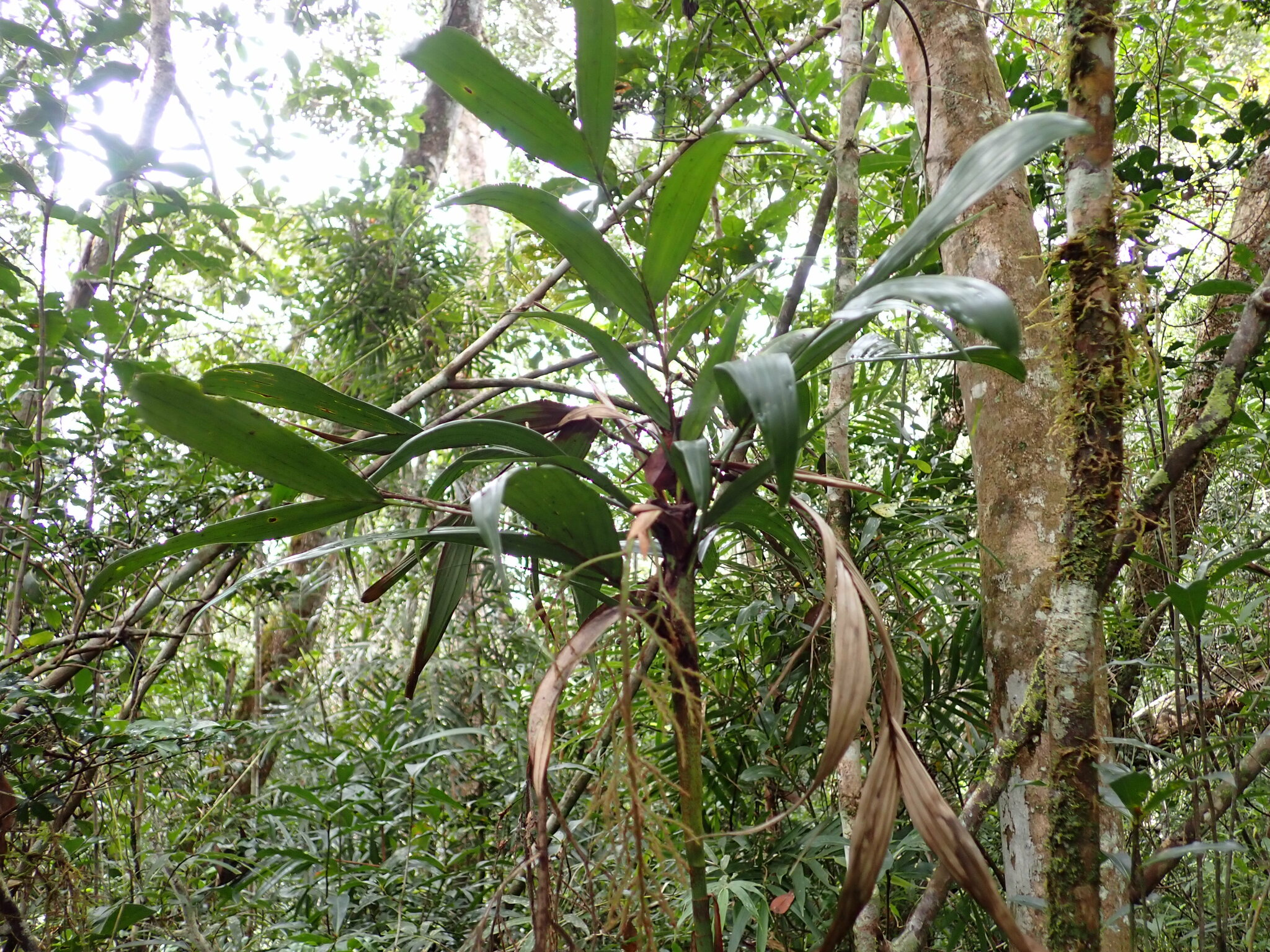
Dypsis hildebrandtii

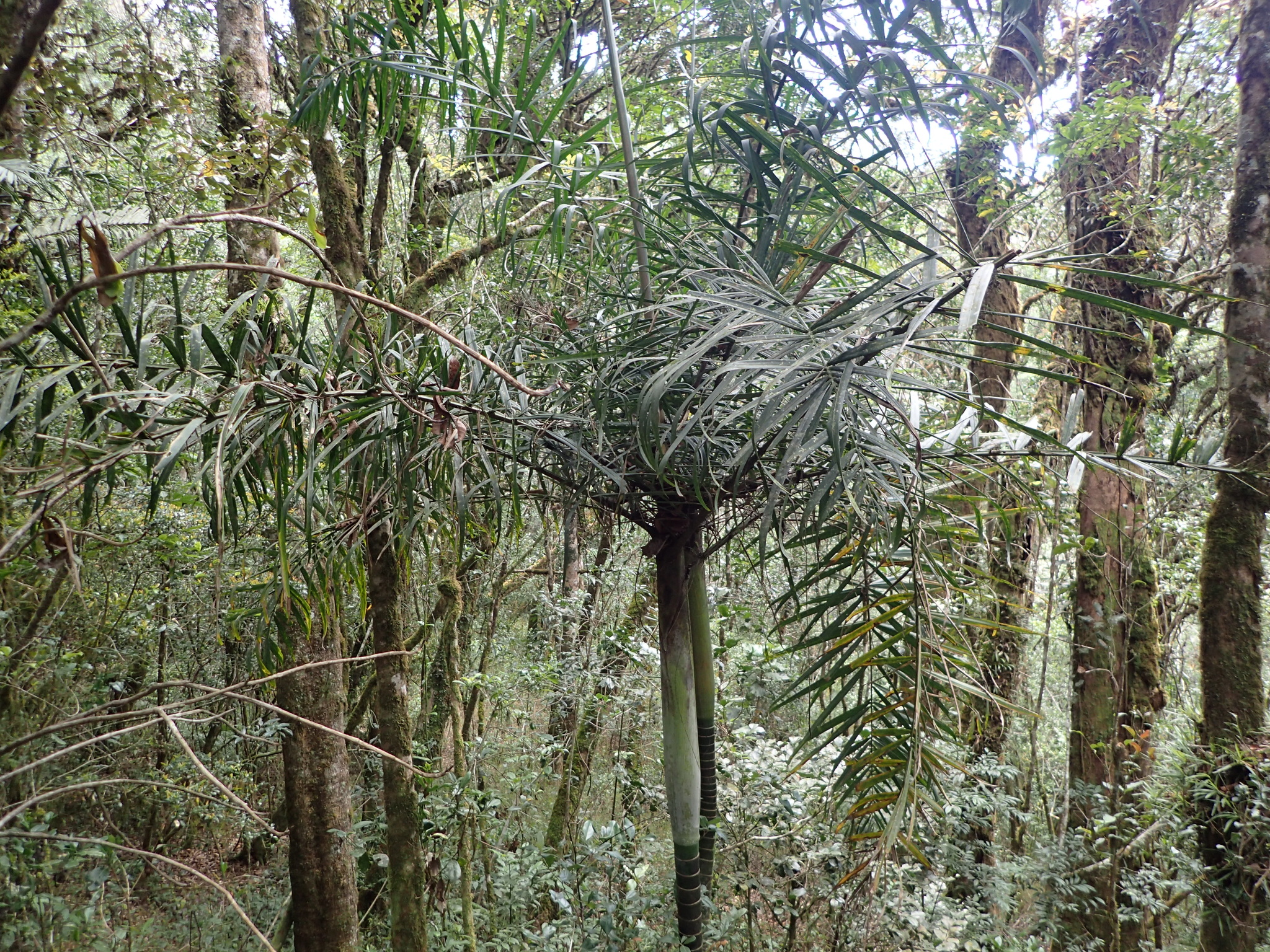
Dypsis rivularis

=== Moved to Chrysalidocarpus ===
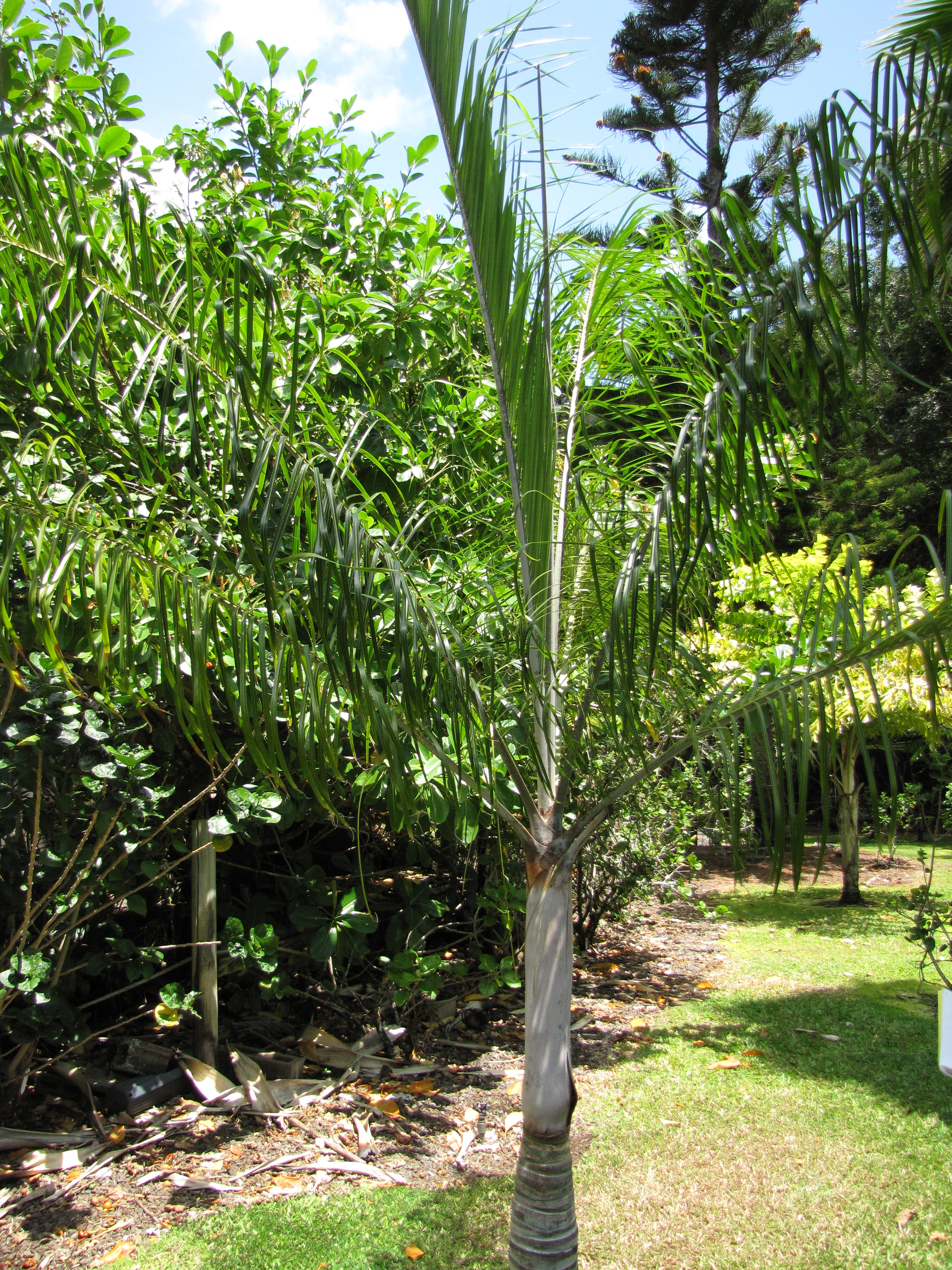
Dypsis ambositrae

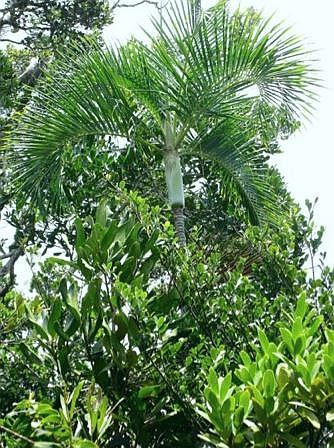
Dypsis arenarum

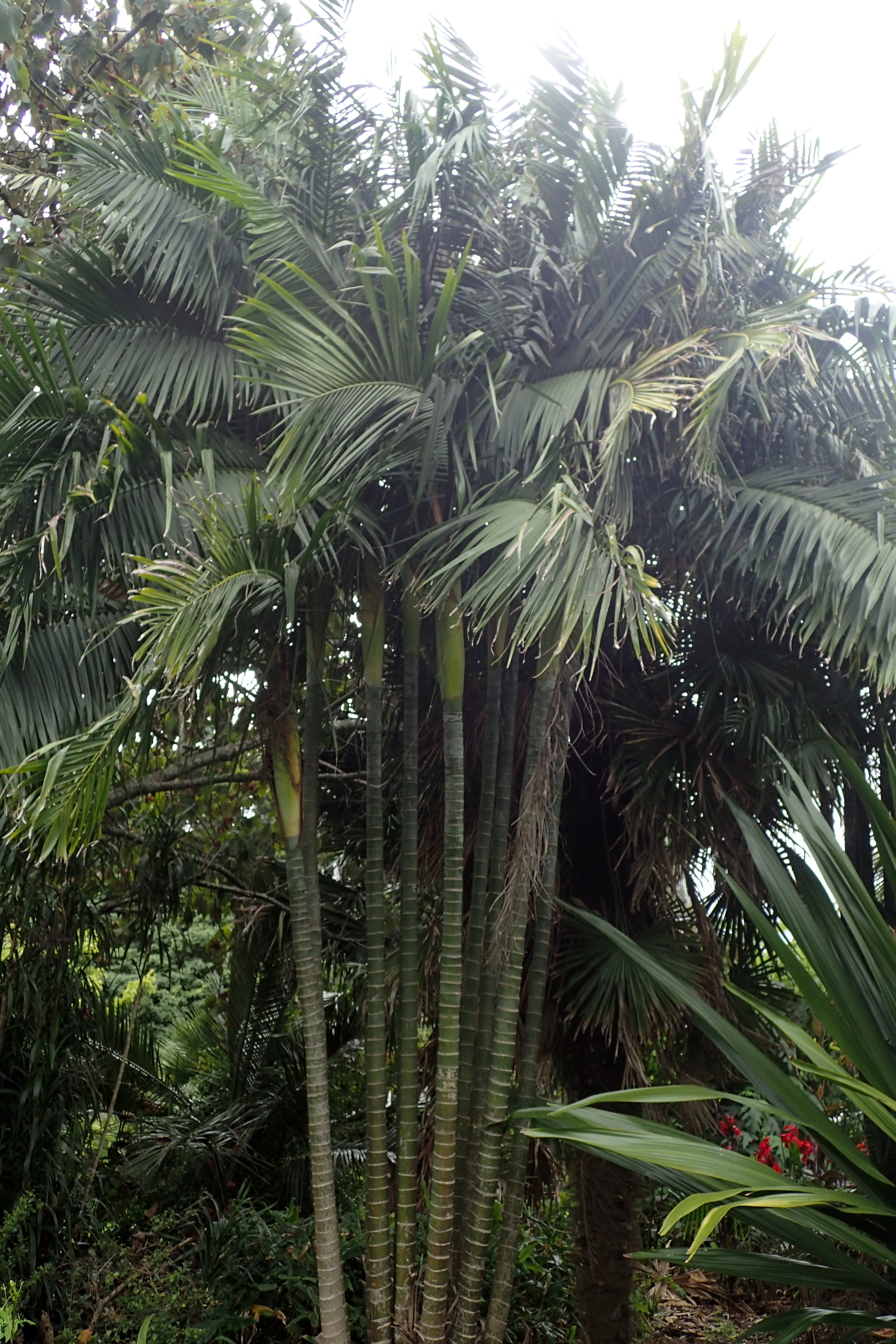
Dypsis baronii

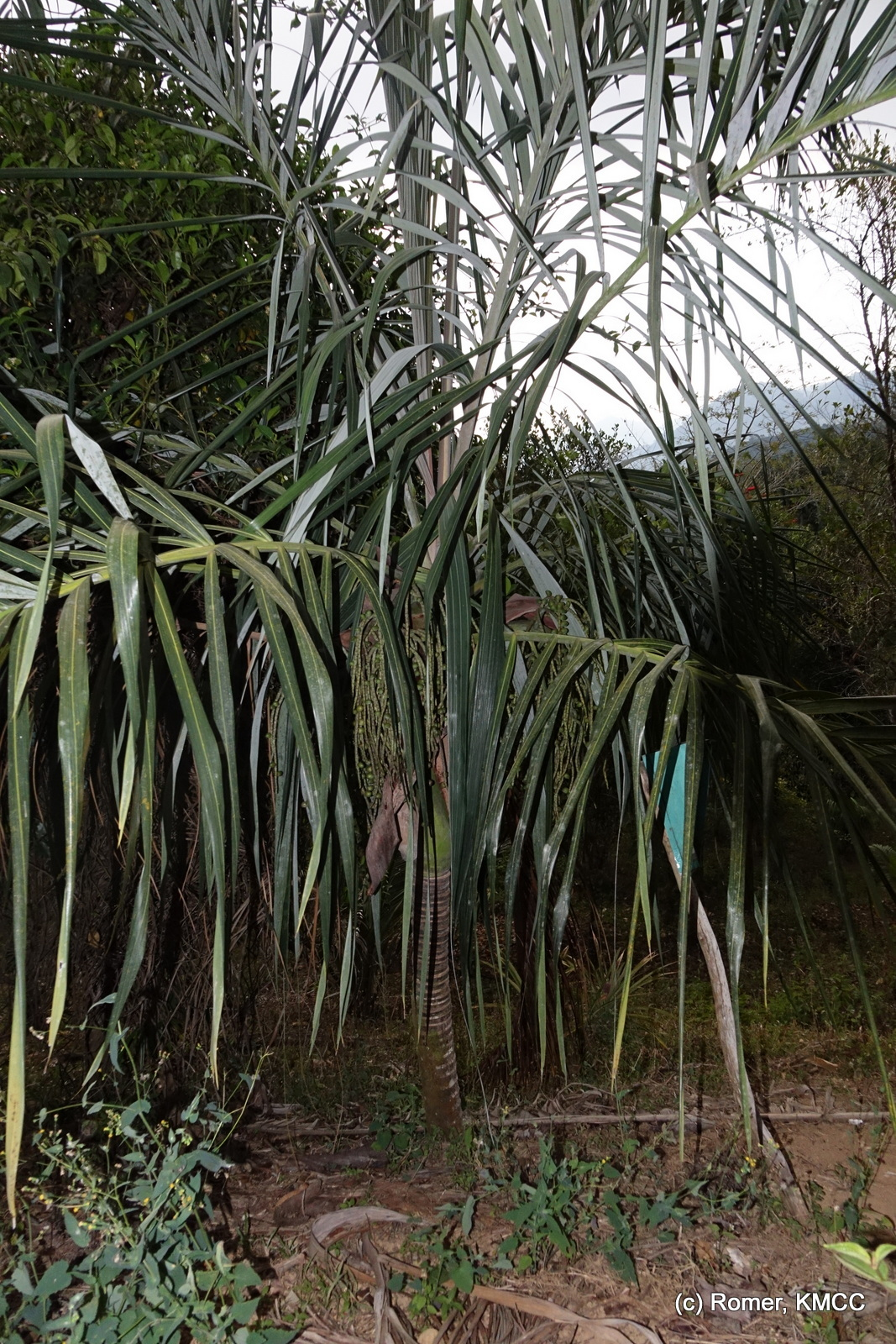
Dypsis basilonga

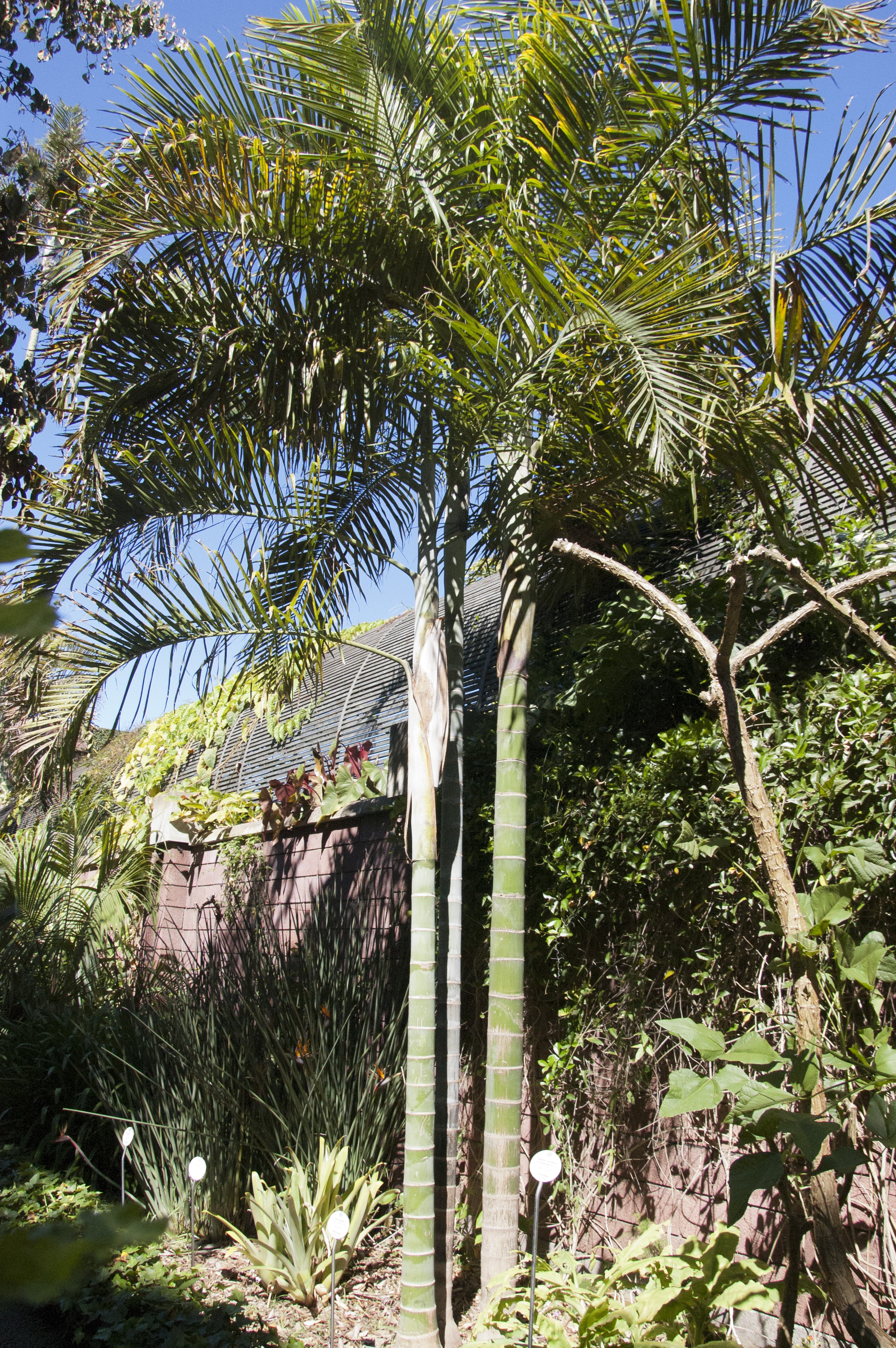
Dypsis cabadae

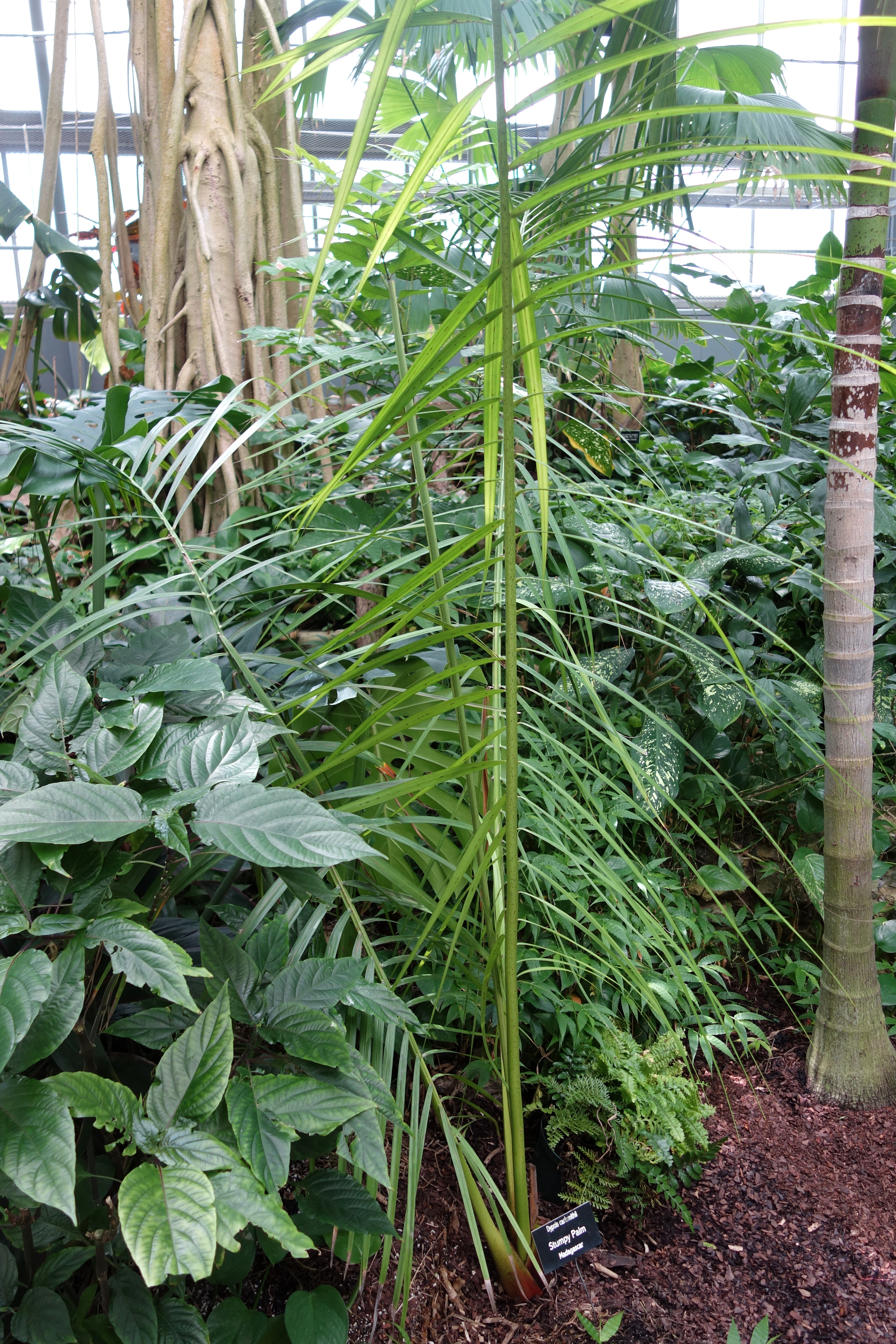
Dypsis carlsmithii

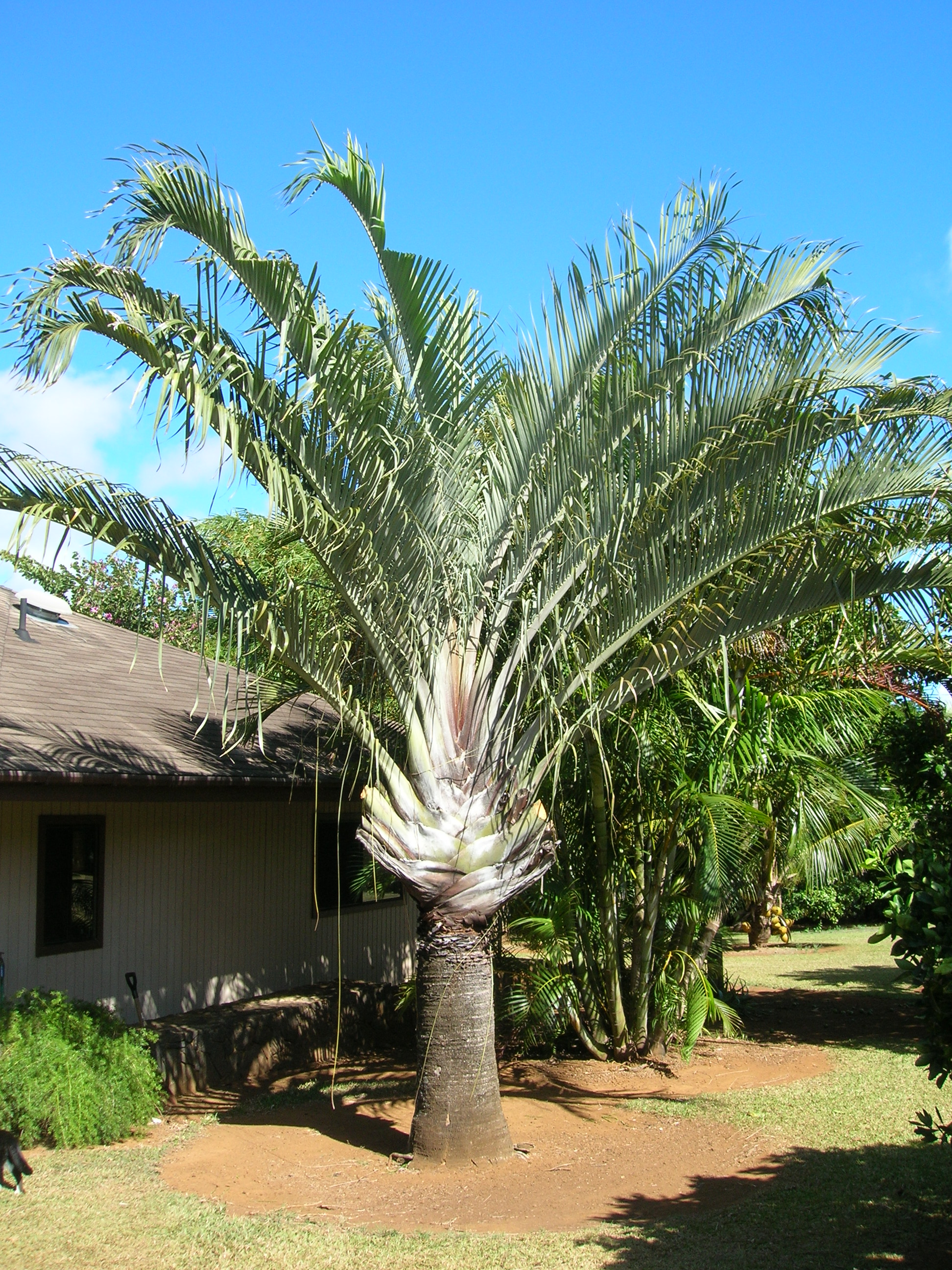
Dypsis decaryi

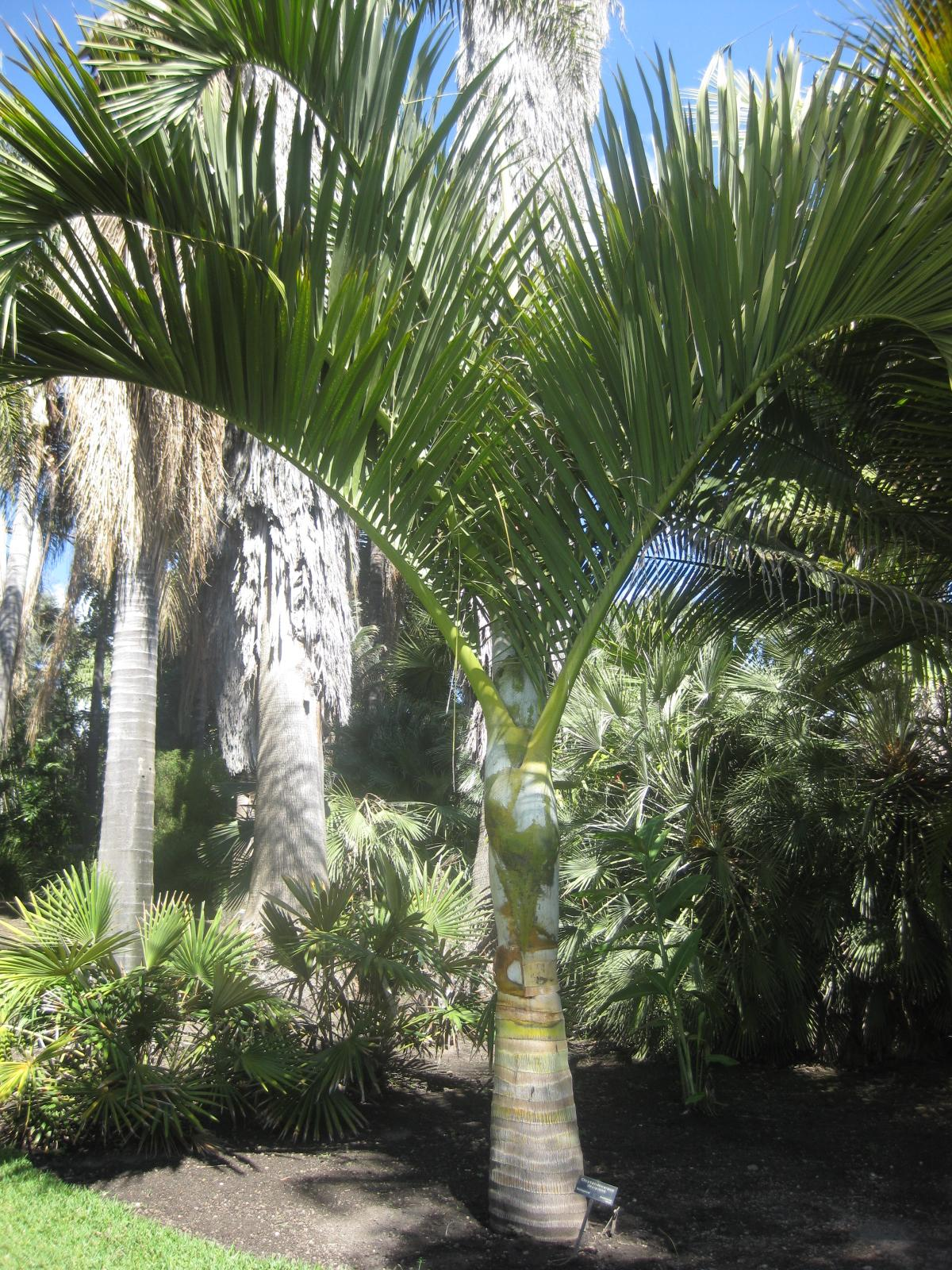
Dypsis decipiens

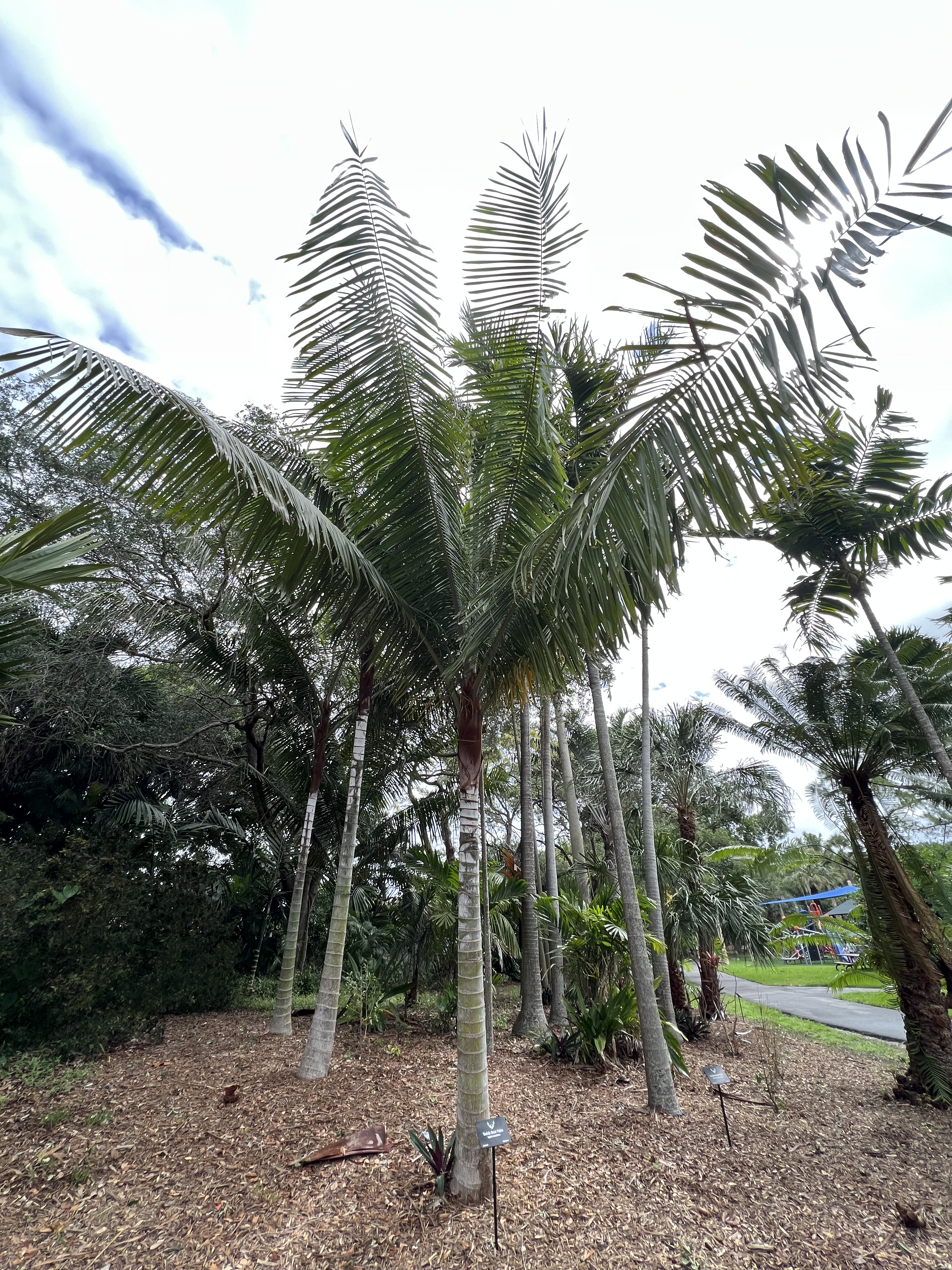
Dypsis lastelliana

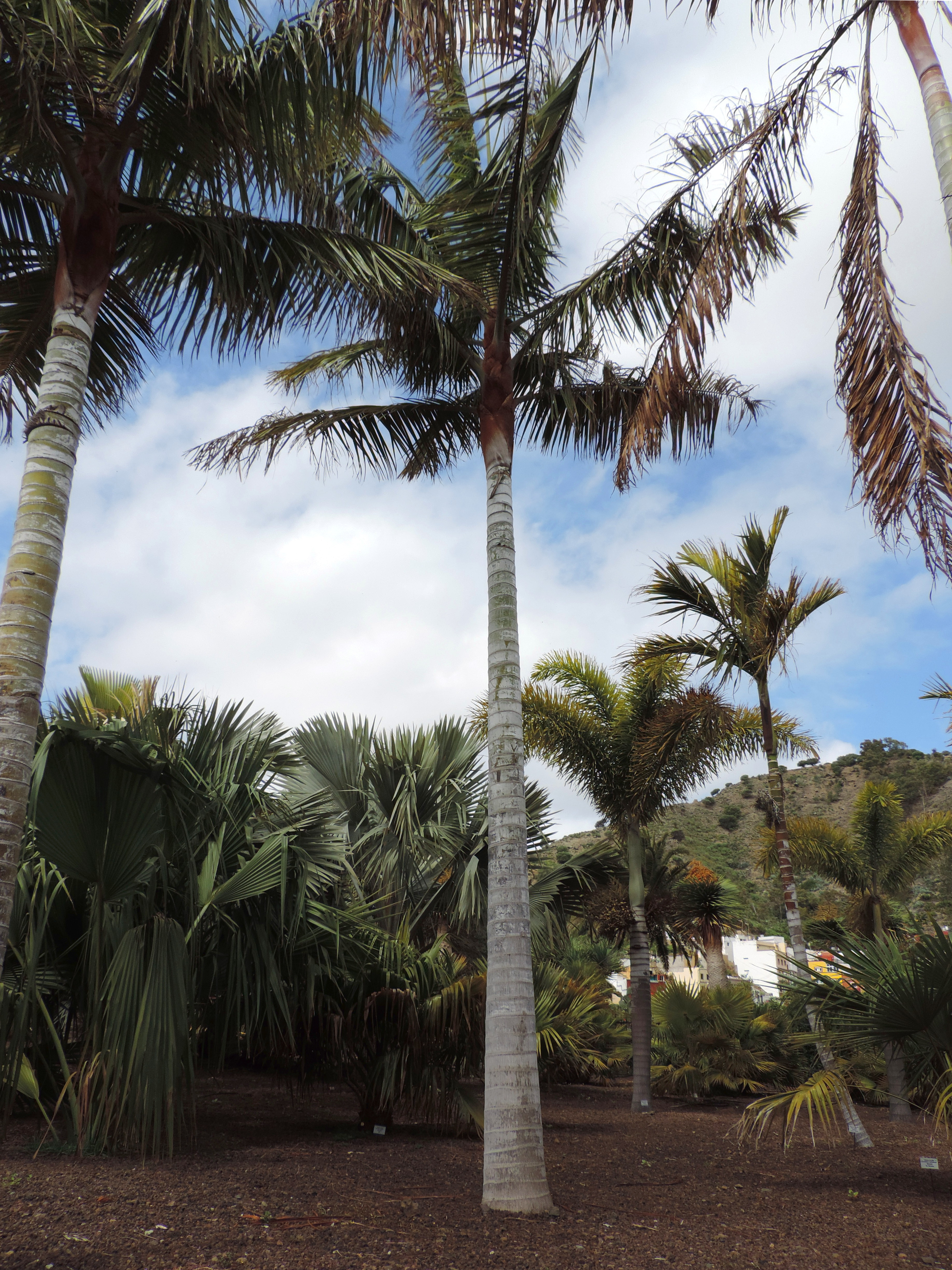
Dypsis leptocheilos

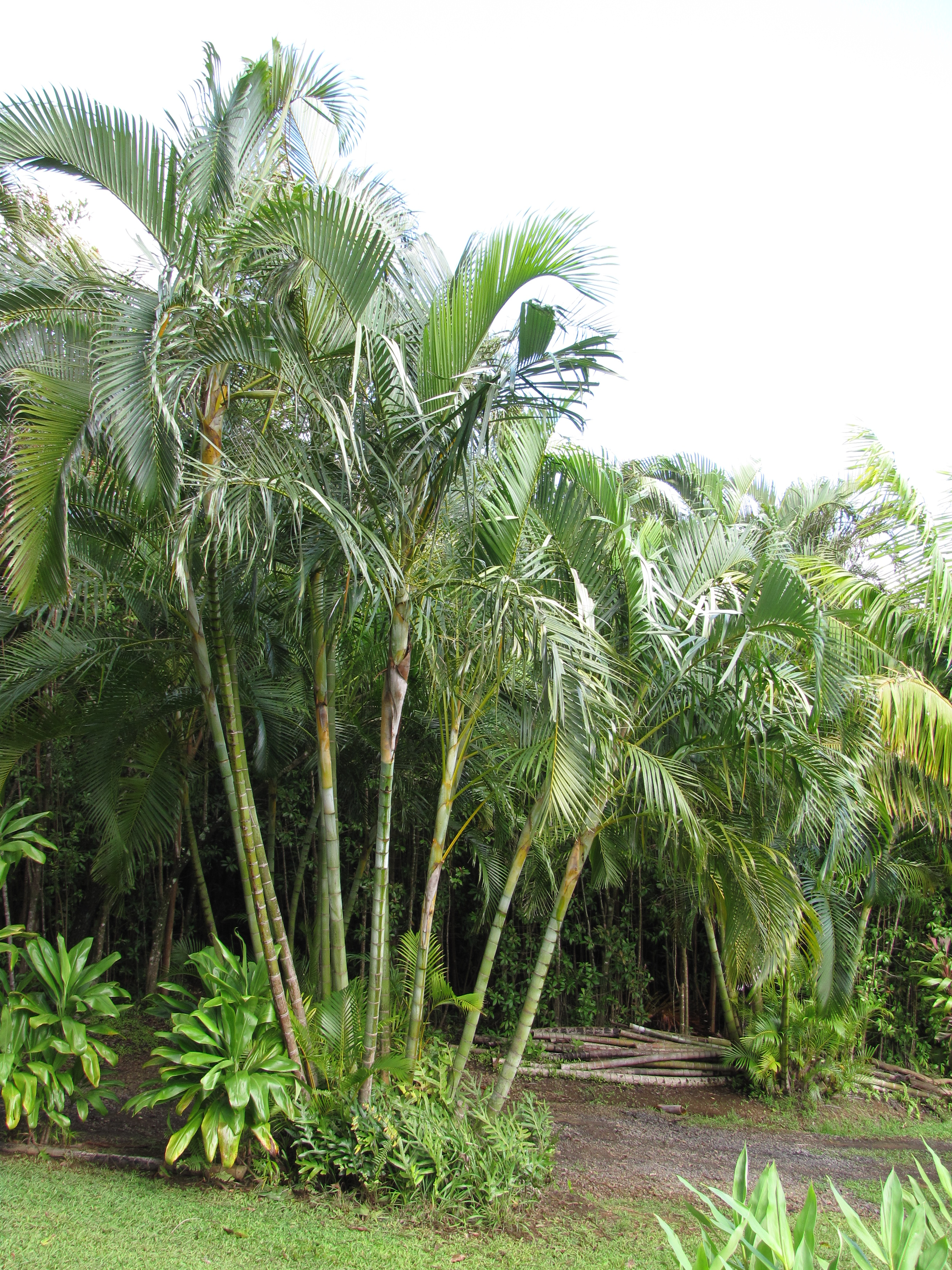
Dypsis lutescens

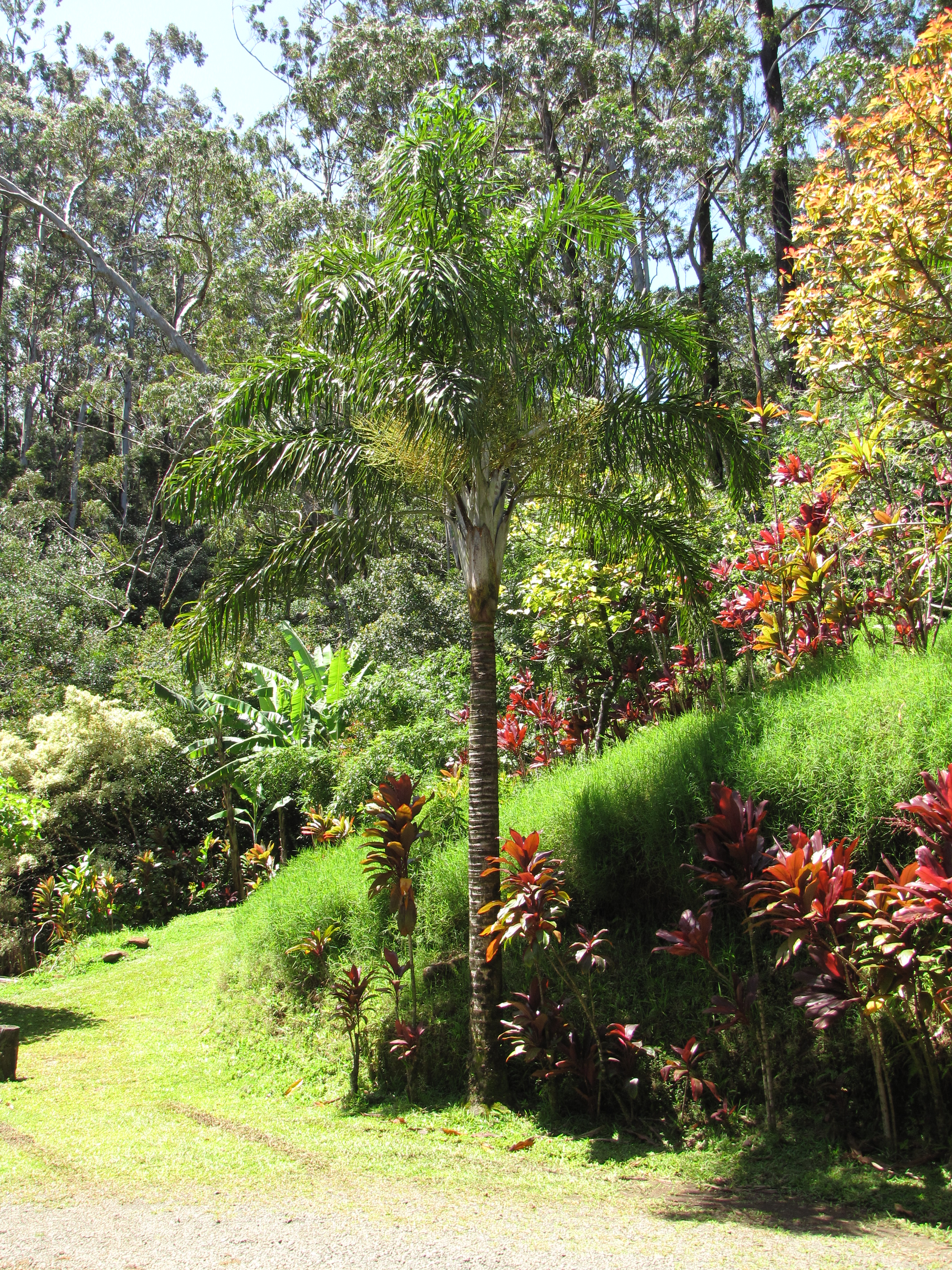
Dypsis madagascariensis

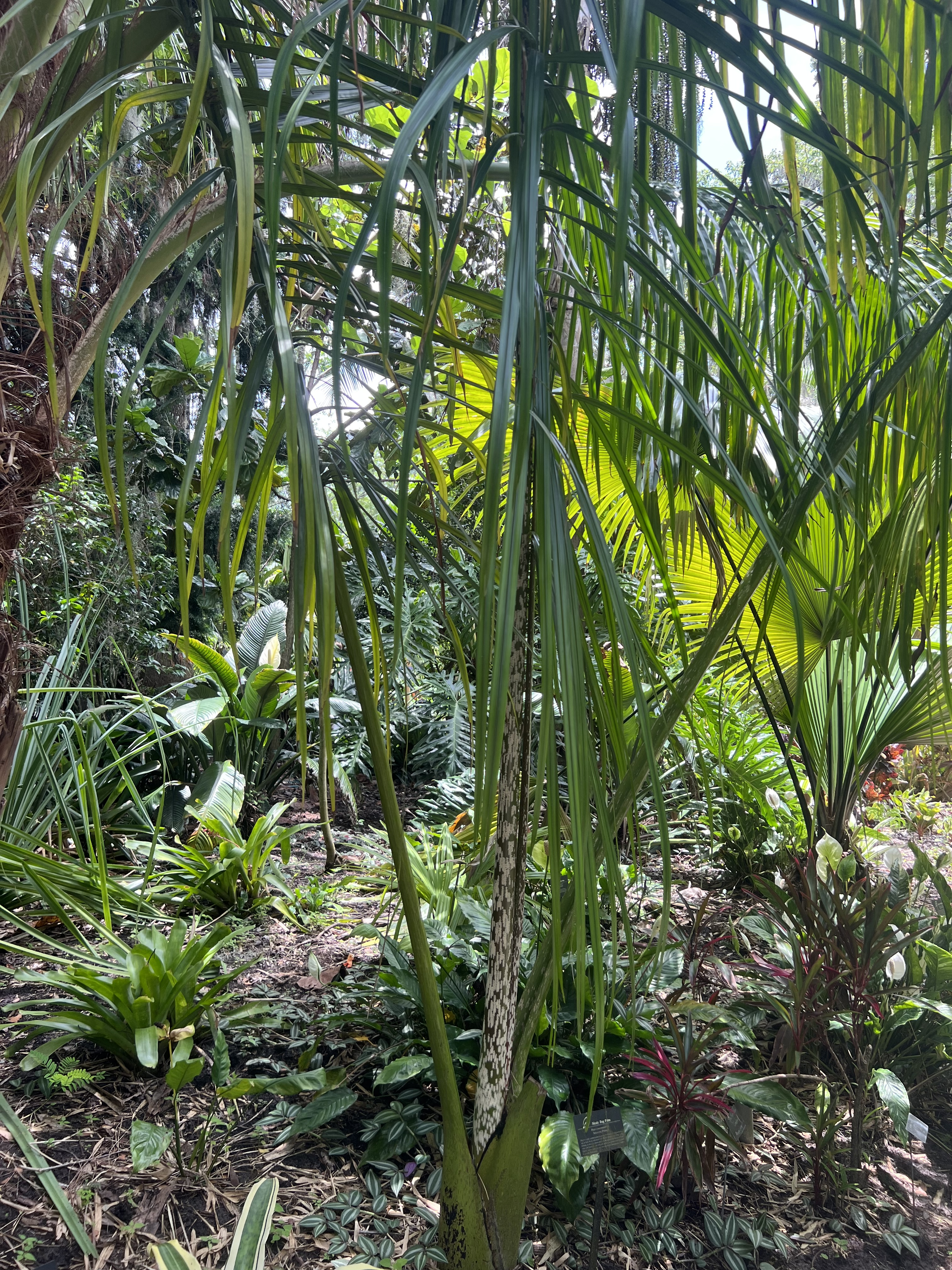
Dypsis mananjarensis

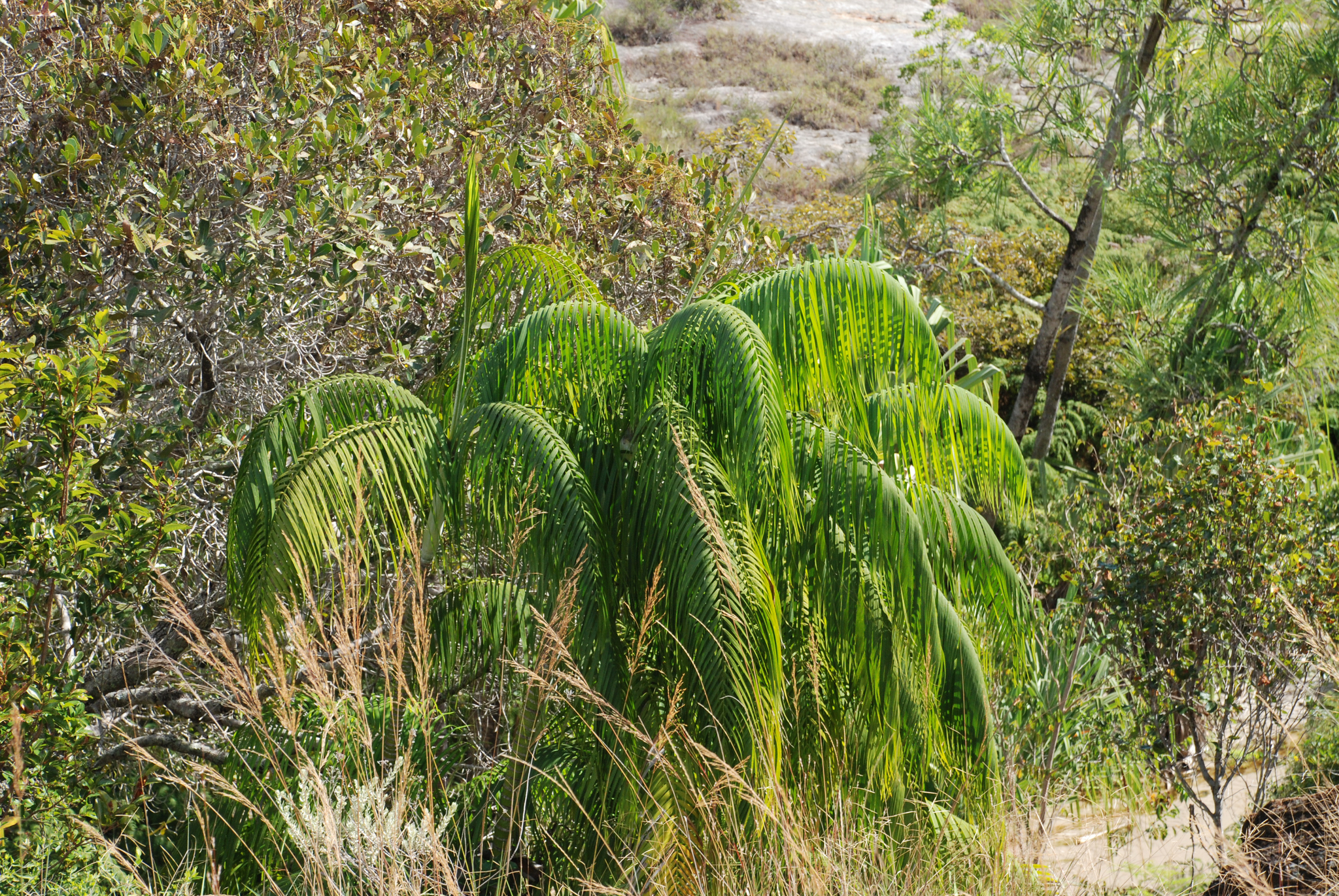
Dypsis onilahensis

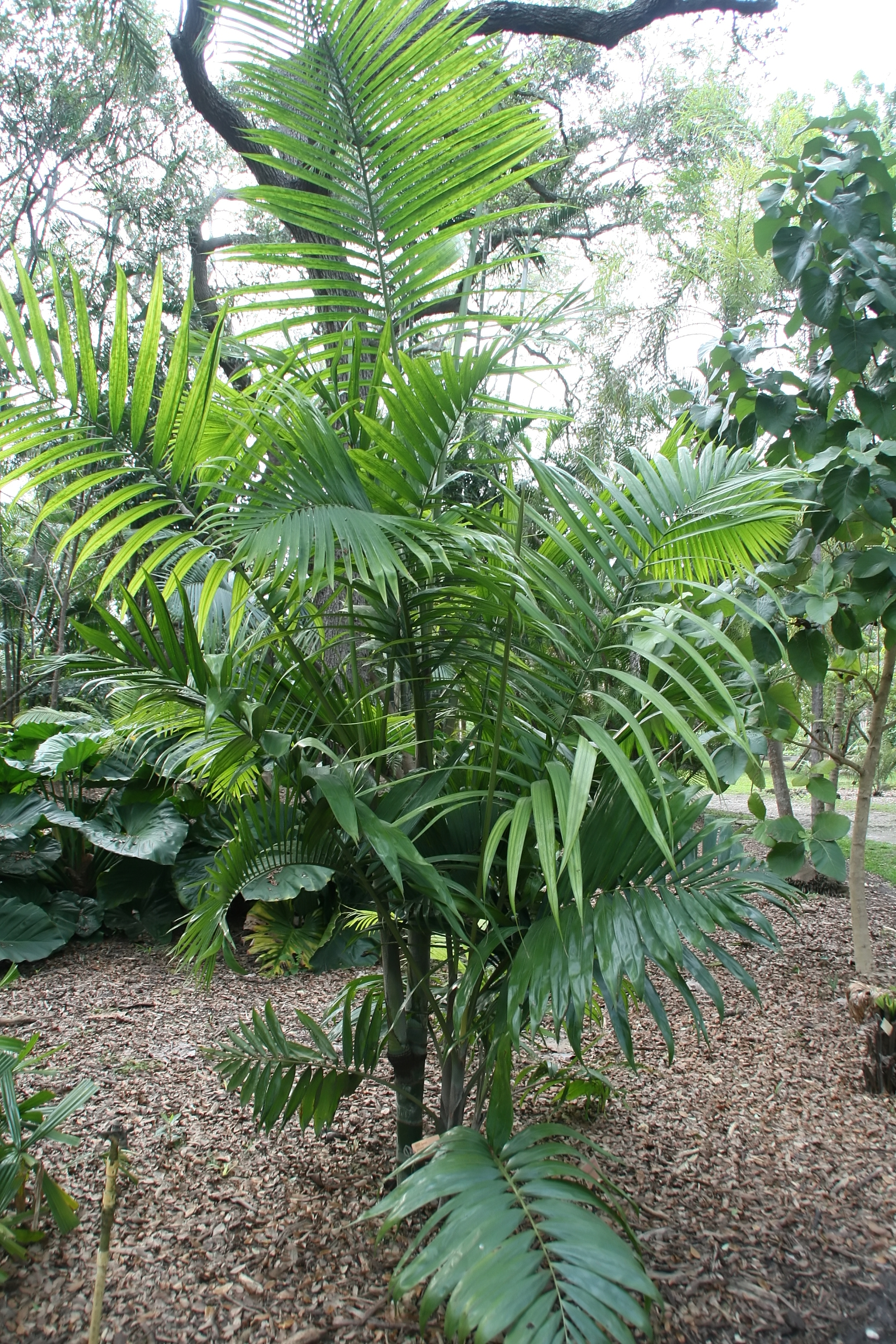
Dypsis pembana

=== Moved to Vonitra ===
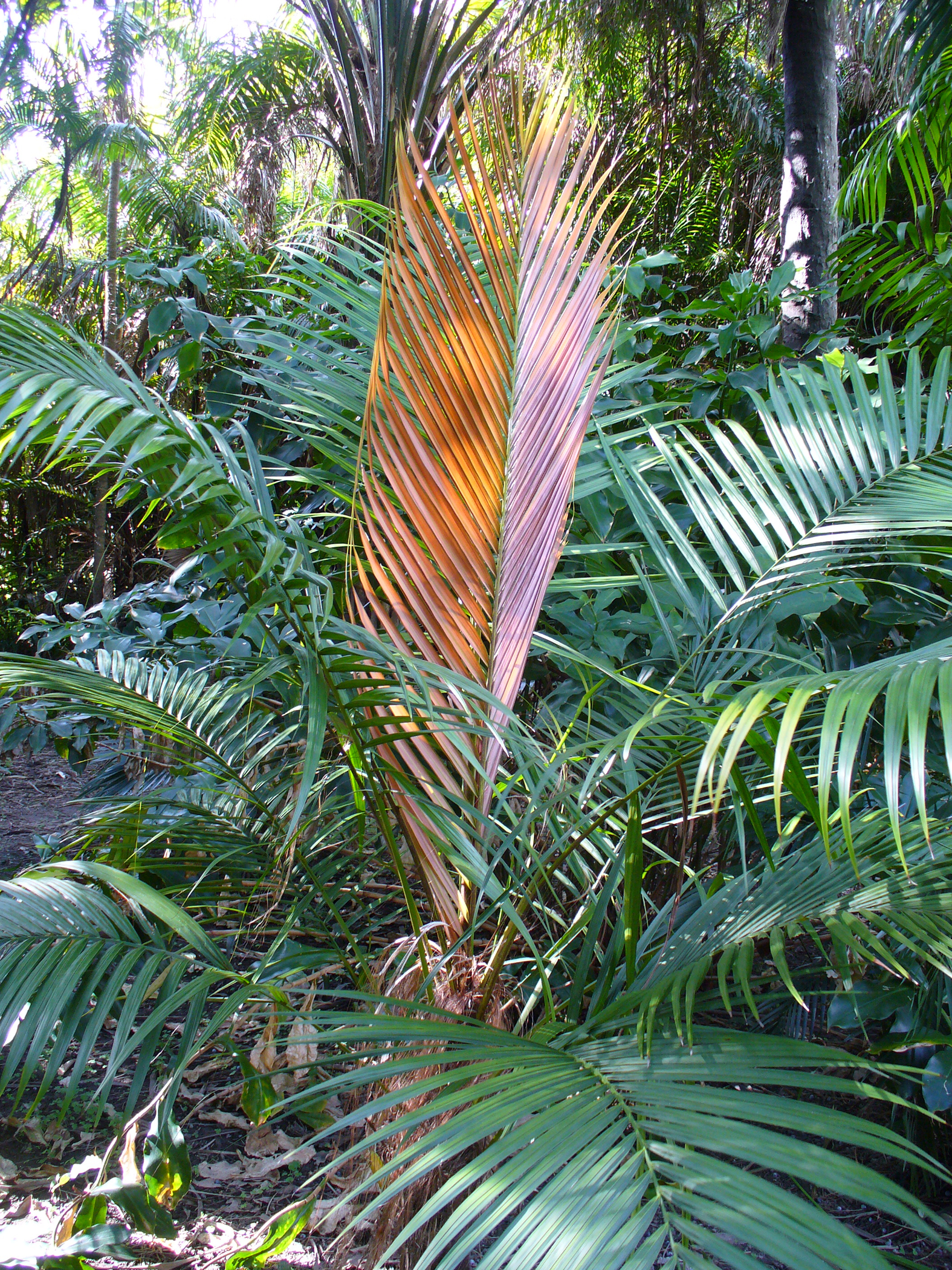
Dypsis crinita

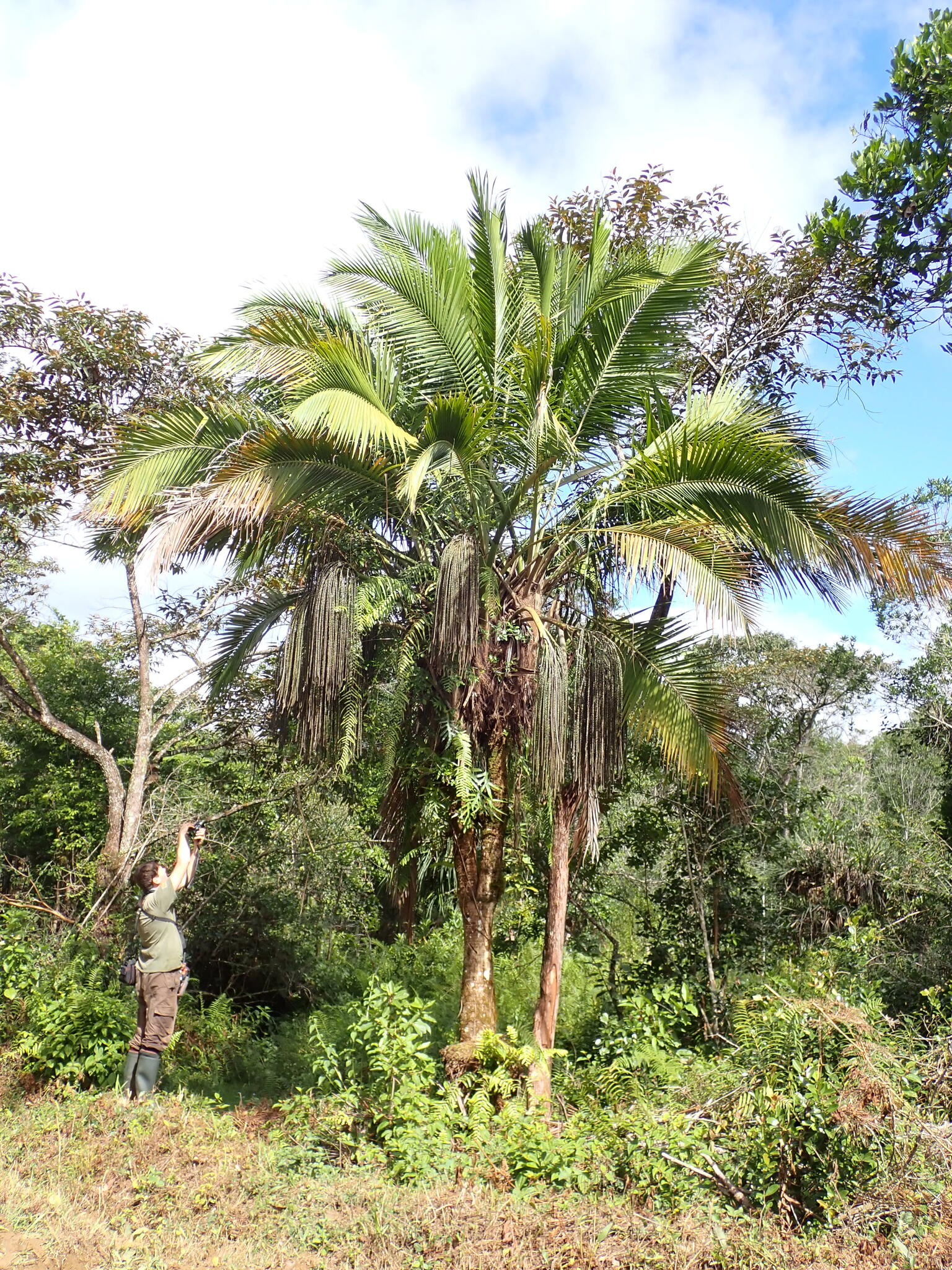
Dypsis utilis
