= Singularis =

Singularis may refer to:

singularis, singular, or singular number, a grammatical number

In biology:

- Dypsis singularis, a species of flowering plant in the family Arecaceae
- Mesocnemis singularis, a species of damselfly in the family Platycnemididae
- Nesopupa singularis, a species of gastropod in the family Pupillidae
- Pyrgomantis singularis, a species of praying mantis found in Kenya
- Renea singularis, a species of gastropod in the family Aciculidae
- Xenerpestes singularis, a species of bird in the family Furnariidae
