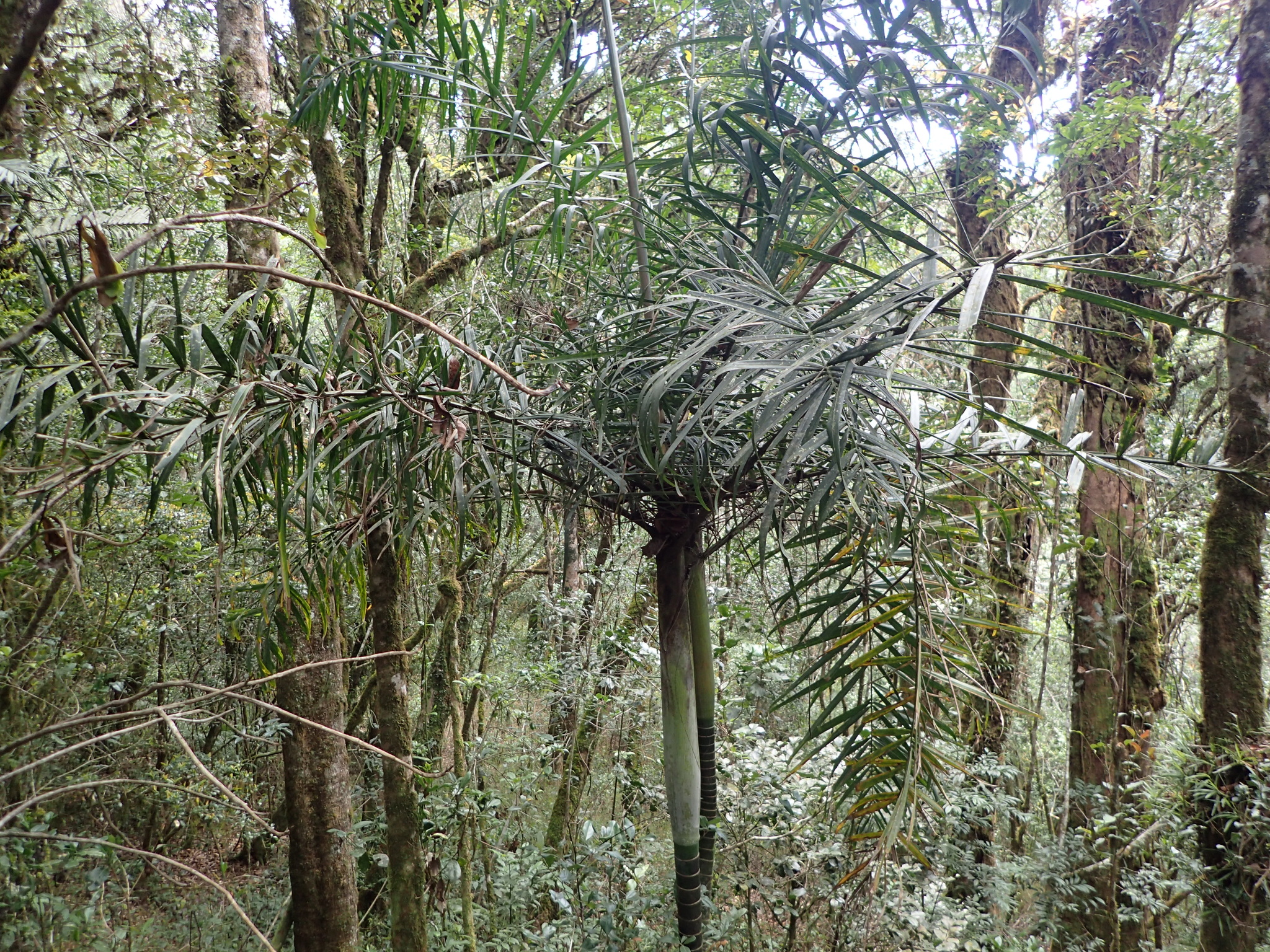

Conservation status
- Endangered (IUCN 3.1)

Scientific classification
- Kingdom: Plantae
- Clade: Embryophytes
- Clade: Tracheophytes
- Clade: Angiosperms
- Clade: Monocots
- Clade: Commelinids
- Order: Arecales
- Family: Arecaceae
- Genus: Dypsis
- Species: D. rivularis

Binomial name
- Dypsis rivularis (Jum. & H.Perrier) Beentje & J.Dransf.

Synonyms
- Chrysalidocarpus rivularis Jum. & H.Perrier

= Dypsis rivularis =

Species of flowering plant

Dypsis rivularis is a species of flowering plant in the Arecaceae family. It is palm endemic to Madagascar, where it grows in forests near rivers. It is threatened by habitat loss. There are fewer than 100 mature individuals estimated to remain.
