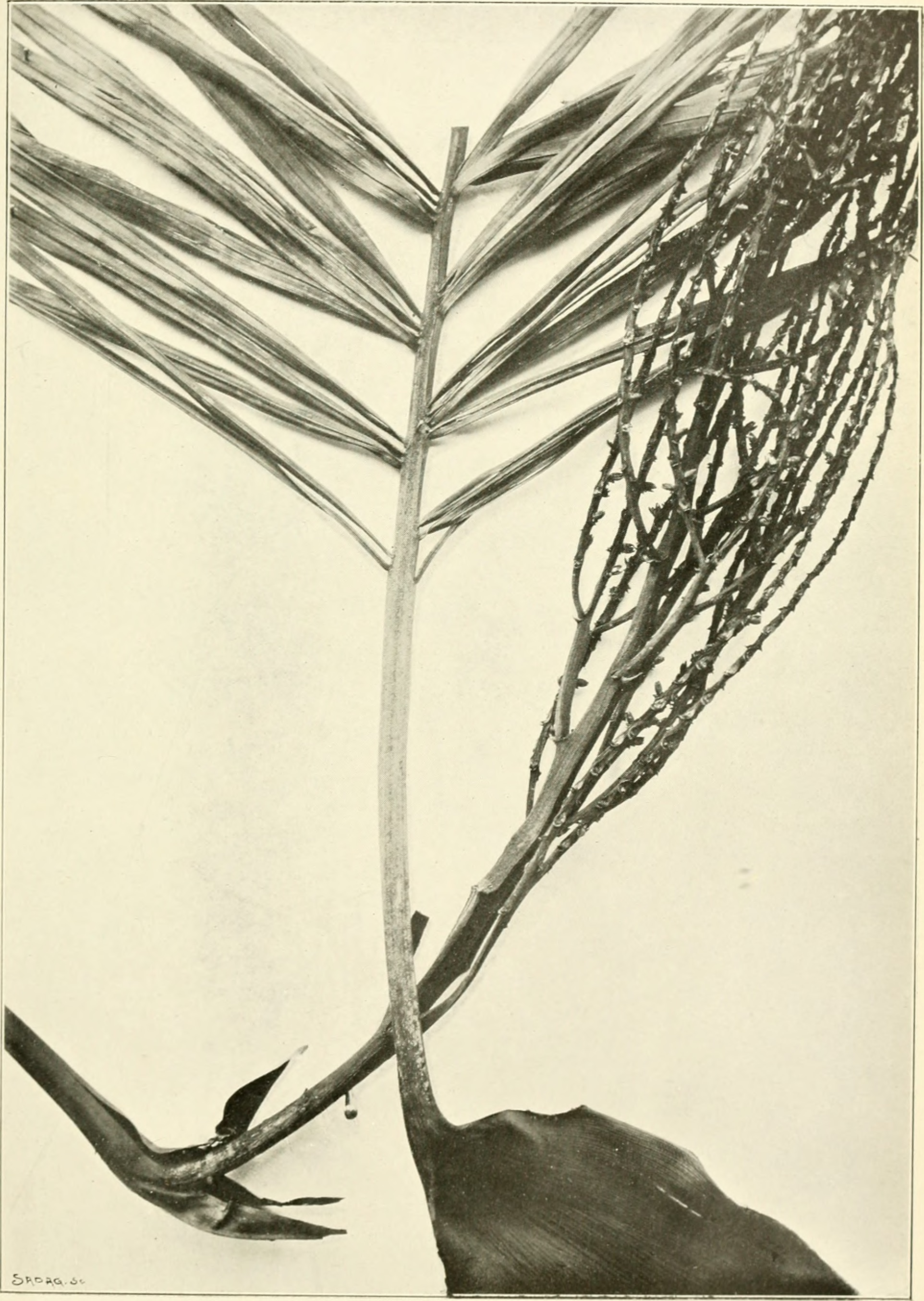

Conservation status
- Critically Endangered (IUCN 3.1)

Scientific classification
- Kingdom: Plantae
- Clade: Embryophytes
- Clade: Tracheophytes
- Clade: Angiosperms
- Clade: Monocots
- Clade: Commelinids
- Order: Arecales
- Family: Arecaceae
- Genus: Dypsis
- Species: D. sahanofensis

Binomial name
- Dypsis sahanofensis (Jum. & H.Perrier) Beentje & J.Dransf.

Synonyms
- Chrysalidocarpus sahanofensis (Jum. & H.Perrier) Jum. Neophloga sahanofensis Jum. & H.Perrier

= Dypsis sahanofensis =

Species of flowering plant

Dypsis sahanofensis is a species of flowering plant in the family Arecaceae. It is found only in Madagascar. It is threatened by habitat loss.
