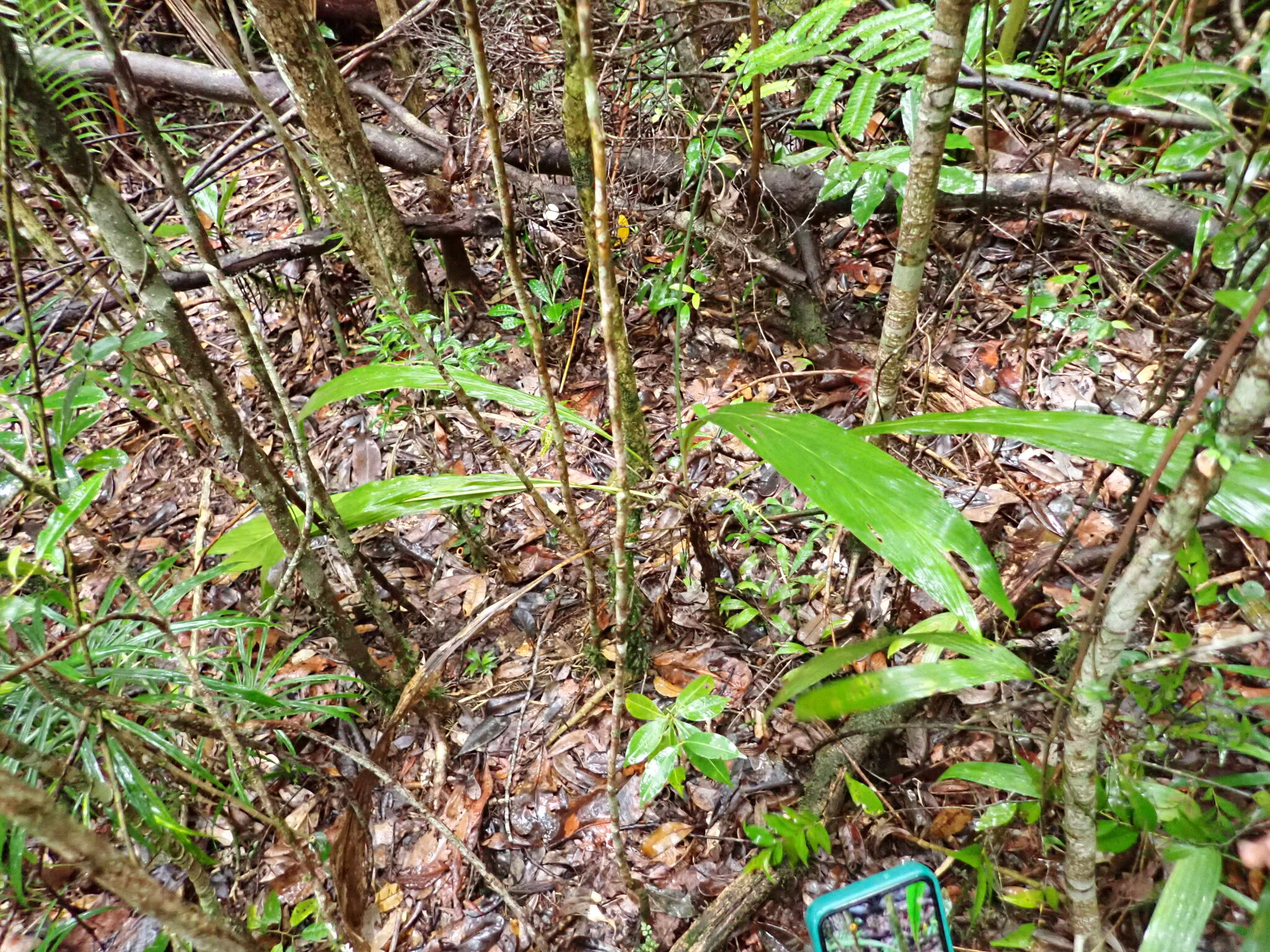

Conservation status
- Critically Endangered (IUCN 3.1)

Scientific classification
- Kingdom: Plantae
- Clade: Tracheophytes
- Clade: Angiosperms
- Clade: Monocots
- Clade: Commelinids
- Order: Arecales
- Family: Arecaceae
- Genus: Dypsis
- Species: D. brevicaulis

Binomial name
- Dypsis brevicaulis (Guillaumet) Beentje & J.Dransf.

Synonyms
- Neophloga brevicaulis (basionym)

= Dypsis brevicaulis =

Species of flowering plant

Dypsis brevicaulis is a species of flowering plant in the Arecaceae family. It is a dwarf palm found on only three sites in Madagascar, with fewer than fifty plants ever found in the wild. The plant is part of the IUCN Sampled Red List Index for Plants, a study of representative species from all over the world which is studying extinction trends for plants.

== Description ==
Dypsis brevicaulis grows from a 15 cm (5.9 in) long stem that is mostly below the ground. It has 5–8 erect leaves covered with reddish scales, with two small lobes at the base of each leaf and ragged edges. The leaves are deeply notched at the end, narrowly triangular in shape, and grow up to 1.5 m (4.9 ft) long. The inflorescences reach up to 40 cm (16 in) long, typically on a single stem, are covered with small hairs, and hold approximately 60-80 flower clusters each. The individual flowers are up to 3 mm (0.12 in) in diameter.

== Taxonomy ==
The specific epithet, brevicaulis ("short-stemmed"), refers to the plant's habit of seeming to grow directly from the ground, appearing to lack a visible stem ("acaulescent"). It was first named and described as Neophloga brevicaulis in 1973 by Jean L. Guillaumet and then reclassified as Dypsis brevicaulis in 1995 by Henk Jaap Beentje and John Dransfield.

== Distribution and habitat ==
Dypsis brevicaulis is native to the far southeast of Madagascar, in coastal evergreen forests north of Manantenina and Manafiafy/Sainte-Luce between 100 and 700 m (330 and 2,300 ft) elevation, growing in white sand or laterite. It is found in only three locations, with fewer than fifty plants ever found in the wild. Its native habitat is threatened by deforestation for cultivation by local villagers, and by plans for mining Ilmenite in the region.

== Conservation ==
The plant is listed as Critically Endangered, the highest risk category for wild plants, by the IUCN Red List. It is included in the IUCN Sampled Red List Index for Plants, an ongoing study of representative plant species from all over the world which is looking at extinction risk and trends.
