= Dypsis boiviniana =

Conservation status
- Endangered (IUCN 3.1)

Scientific classification
- Kingdom: Plantae
- Clade: Tracheophytes
- Clade: Angiosperms
- Clade: Monocots
- Clade: Commelinids
- Order: Arecales
- Family: Arecaceae
- Genus: Dypsis
- Species: D. boiviniana

Binomial name
- Dypsis boiviniana Baill.

Species of palm

Dypsis boiviniana is a species of palm tree. It is endemic to Madagascar. Its common name is talanoka.

This plant grows in rainforests. There are fewer than 100 mature individuals estimated to remain.
