= Dypsis humilis =

Conservation status
- Critically Endangered (IUCN 3.1)

Scientific classification
- Kingdom: Plantae
- Clade: Tracheophytes
- Clade: Angiosperms
- Clade: Monocots
- Clade: Commelinids
- Order: Arecales
- Family: Arecaceae
- Genus: Dypsis
- Species: D. humilis

Binomial name
- Dypsis humilis M.S.Trudgen, Rakotoarin. & W.J.Baker

Species of palm

Dypsis humilis is a rare species of stemless palm that was discovered in Madagascar in 2007 by a collaboration between botanists from Madagascar and Royal Botanical Gardens, Kew. Fewer than ten plants were observed in an area that is threatened by logging and other human activity.

== Description ==
Dypsis humilis is a low growing palm with no visible stem ("acaulescent"), and approximately eight leaves sprouting from the ground—described as looking "like a shuttlecock". The leaves are approximately 80 cm (31 in) long, with about sixteen leathery leaflets on each leaf. The inflorescences are inconspicuous, from 22 to 35 cm (8.7 to 13.8 in) long, growing at the base of the plant amidst the leaves. The pistilate flowers are 2.5 mm (0.098 in) by 1 mm (0.039 in), with sickle-shaped fruits that are approximately 1.8 mm (0.071 in) long and .3 mm (0.012 in) wide. The species is quite distinct from other Dypsis species in Madagascar, with only two other acaulescent species previously recorded—both of which have very different leaves and habitat.

== Taxonomy ==
The plant was named and described in 2009 by Kew scientists Melinda Trudgen, Mijoro Rakotoarinivo, and William Baker. The specific epithet, humilis, refers to the low growing habit, or "humble" height of the plant.

== Distribution and habitat ==
Dypsis humilis grows in northeast Madagascar, near the Antainambalana River, outside of Maroantsetra, a seaport town on the Bay of Antongil. It is found in rainforest on a granitic ridge top between 100 and 200 m (330 and 660 ft) elevation. Fewer than ten plants were seen, in an area of forest disturbed by human activity, including logging.

== Conservation ==
The plant is provisionally listed as Critically Endangered, the highest risk category for wild plants, by the IUCN Red List. The only known plants are in an unprotected area just outside Makira Natural Park, so the species' survival is not very secure. Madagascar has less than 10% of its native vegetation intact, with an additional 200,000-300,000 hectares of forest lost each year. Out of 172 Madagascar palm species known in 2007, only 18 are not threatened by habitat loss, with many on the edge of extinction.
