= Dypsis faneva =

Conservation status
- Endangered (IUCN 3.1)

Scientific classification
- Kingdom: Plantae
- Clade: Embryophytes
- Clade: Tracheophytes
- Clade: Angiosperms
- Clade: Monocots
- Clade: Commelinids
- Order: Arecales
- Family: Arecaceae
- Genus: Dypsis
- Species: D. faneva

Binomial name
- Dypsis faneva Beentje

Species of flowering plant

Dypsis faneva is a species of flowering plant in the Arecaceae family. It is a palm endemic to Madagascar, where it grows in rainforests. It is threatened by habitat destruction. Fewer than 70 mature individuals are thought to remain.
