= Dypsis scottiana =

Conservation status
- Vulnerable (IUCN 3.1)

Scientific classification
- Kingdom: Plantae
- Clade: Embryophytes
- Clade: Tracheophytes
- Clade: Angiosperms
- Clade: Monocots
- Clade: Commelinids
- Order: Arecales
- Family: Arecaceae
- Genus: Dypsis
- Species: D. scottiana

Binomial name
- Dypsis scottiana (Becc.) Beentje & J.Dransf.

Synonyms
- Neophloga affinis Becc. Neophloga scottiana (Becc.) Becc. Phloga scottiana Becc.

Species of flowering plant

Dypsis scottiana is a species of flowering plant in the family Arecaceae. It is found only in Madagascar. It is threatened by habitat loss.
