= Dypsis scandens =

Conservation status
- Critically Endangered (IUCN 3.1)

Scientific classification
- Kingdom: Plantae
- Clade: Tracheophytes
- Clade: Angiosperms
- Clade: Monocots
- Clade: Commelinids
- Order: Arecales
- Family: Arecaceae
- Genus: Dypsis
- Species: D. scandens

Binomial name
- Dypsis scandens J.Dransf.

Species of plant

Dypsis scandens is a species of flowering plant in the family Arecaceae. The species is native to Eastern Madagascar in the area of Ifanadiana.
