= Dypsis interrupta =

Conservation status
- Critically Endangered (IUCN 3.1)

Scientific classification
- Kingdom: Plantae
- Clade: Tracheophytes
- Clade: Angiosperms
- Clade: Monocots
- Clade: Commelinids
- Order: Arecales
- Family: Arecaceae
- Genus: Dypsis
- Species: D. interrupta

Binomial name
- Dypsis interrupta J.Dransf.

Species of palm

Dypsis interrupta is a species of flowering plant in the family Arecaceae. It is a palm native to southeastern Madagascar, where it grows in the lowland rain forest understory from 50 to 200 meters elevation. It is known from two sites at Ifanadiana and Manombo, with an estimated population of fewer than 40 individuals. The species is threatened by habitat loss, and the IUCN Red List assesses it as critically endangered.
