= Dypsis beentjei =

Conservation status
- Critically Endangered (IUCN 3.1)

Scientific classification
- Kingdom: Plantae
- Clade: Tracheophytes
- Clade: Angiosperms
- Clade: Monocots
- Clade: Commelinids
- Order: Arecales
- Family: Arecaceae
- Genus: Dypsis
- Species: D. beentjei

Binomial name
- Dypsis beentjei J.Dransf.

Species of flowering plant

Dypsis beentjei is an acaulescent flowering plant belonging to the family of palm trees, Arecaceae. It's been called after the botanicus Henk Jaap Beentje.

== Description ==
It is a clustering acaulescent palm with subterranean and procumbent stems. Stem is 4 by 1.4 cm, a dull brown, with 2 mm diameter roots.

== Distribution ==
It is endemic to Madagascar and only known from Antanambe forest at elevations of 300–400 m (980–1,310 ft) above sea level.
