= Dypsis fasciculata =

Conservation status
- Near Threatened (IUCN 3.1)

Scientific classification
- Kingdom: Plantae
- Clade: Tracheophytes
- Clade: Angiosperms
- Clade: Monocots
- Clade: Commelinids
- Order: Arecales
- Family: Arecaceae
- Genus: Dypsis
- Species: D. fasciculata

Binomial name
- Dypsis fasciculata Jum.

Species of palm

Dypsis fasciculata is a species of flowering plant in the family Arecaceae. It is found only in Madagascar. It is threatened by habitat loss.
