= Dypsis mcdonaldiana =

Conservation status
- Endangered (IUCN 3.1)

Scientific classification
- Kingdom: Plantae
- Clade: Embryophytes
- Clade: Tracheophytes
- Clade: Angiosperms
- Clade: Monocots
- Clade: Commelinids
- Order: Arecales
- Family: Arecaceae
- Genus: Dypsis
- Species: D. mcdonaldiana

Binomial name
- Dypsis mcdonaldiana Beentje

Species of flowering plant

Dypsis mcdonaldiana is a species of flowering plant in the family Arecaceae. It is found only in Madagascar. It is threatened by habitat loss.
