= Dypsis commersoniana =

Conservation status
- Data Deficient (IUCN 3.1)

Scientific classification
- Kingdom: Plantae
- Clade: Embryophytes
- Clade: Tracheophytes
- Clade: Angiosperms
- Clade: Monocots
- Clade: Commelinids
- Order: Arecales
- Family: Arecaceae
- Genus: Dypsis
- Species: D. commersoniana

Binomial name
- Dypsis commersoniana (Baill.) Beentje & J.Dransf.

Synonyms
- Neophloga commersoniana Baill. Neophloga pygmaea Pic.Serm.

Species of flowering plant

Dypsis commersoniana is a species of flowering plant in the family Arecaceae. It is a clustering palm endemic to southeastern Madagascar, where it grows in lowland rain forest. It is threatened by habitat loss.
