= Pyrgomantis singularis =

Scientific classification
- Kingdom: Animalia
- Phylum: Arthropoda
- Clade: Pancrustacea
- Class: Insecta
- Order: Mantodea
- Family: Eremiaphilidae
- Genus: Pyrgomantis
- Species: P. singularis

Binomial name
- Pyrgomantis singularis Gerstaecker, 1869

Species of praying mantis

Pyrgomantis singularis is a species of praying mantis found in Kenya, Natal, Tanzania, and the Transvaal.

== See also ==
- List of mantis genera and species
