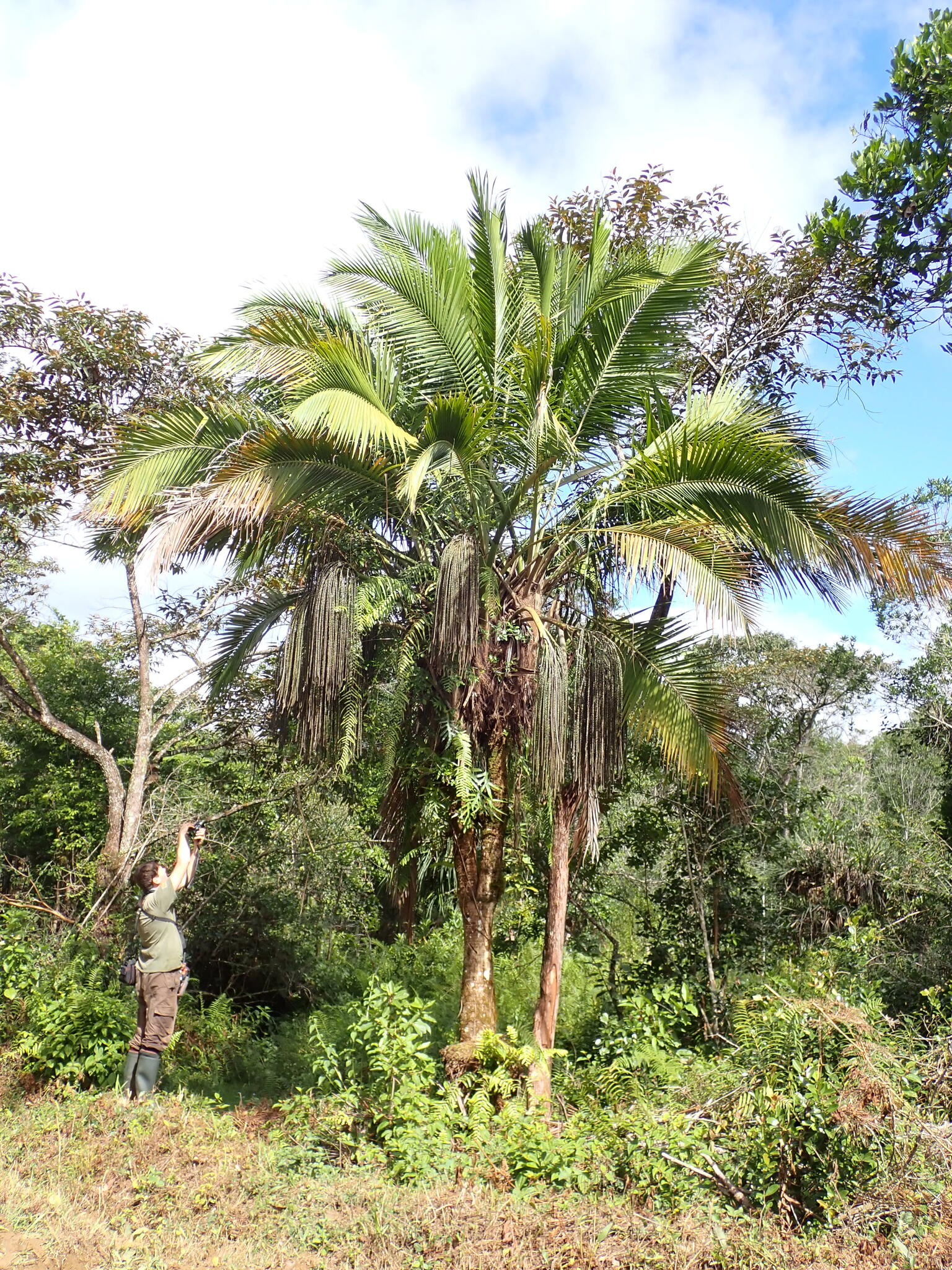

Conservation status
- Endangered (IUCN 3.1)

Scientific classification
- Kingdom: Plantae
- Clade: Embryophytes
- Clade: Tracheophytes
- Clade: Angiosperms
- Clade: Monocots
- Clade: Commelinids
- Order: Arecales
- Family: Arecaceae
- Genus: Vonitra
- Species: V. utilis

Binomial name
- Vonitra utilis Jum.

Synonyms
- Dypsis utilis (Jum.) Beentje & J.Dransf.

= Vonitra utilis =

Species of flowering plant

Vonitra utilis, synonym Dypsis utilis, is a species of flowering plant in the family Arecaceae. It is found only in Madagascar. It is threatened by habitat loss.
