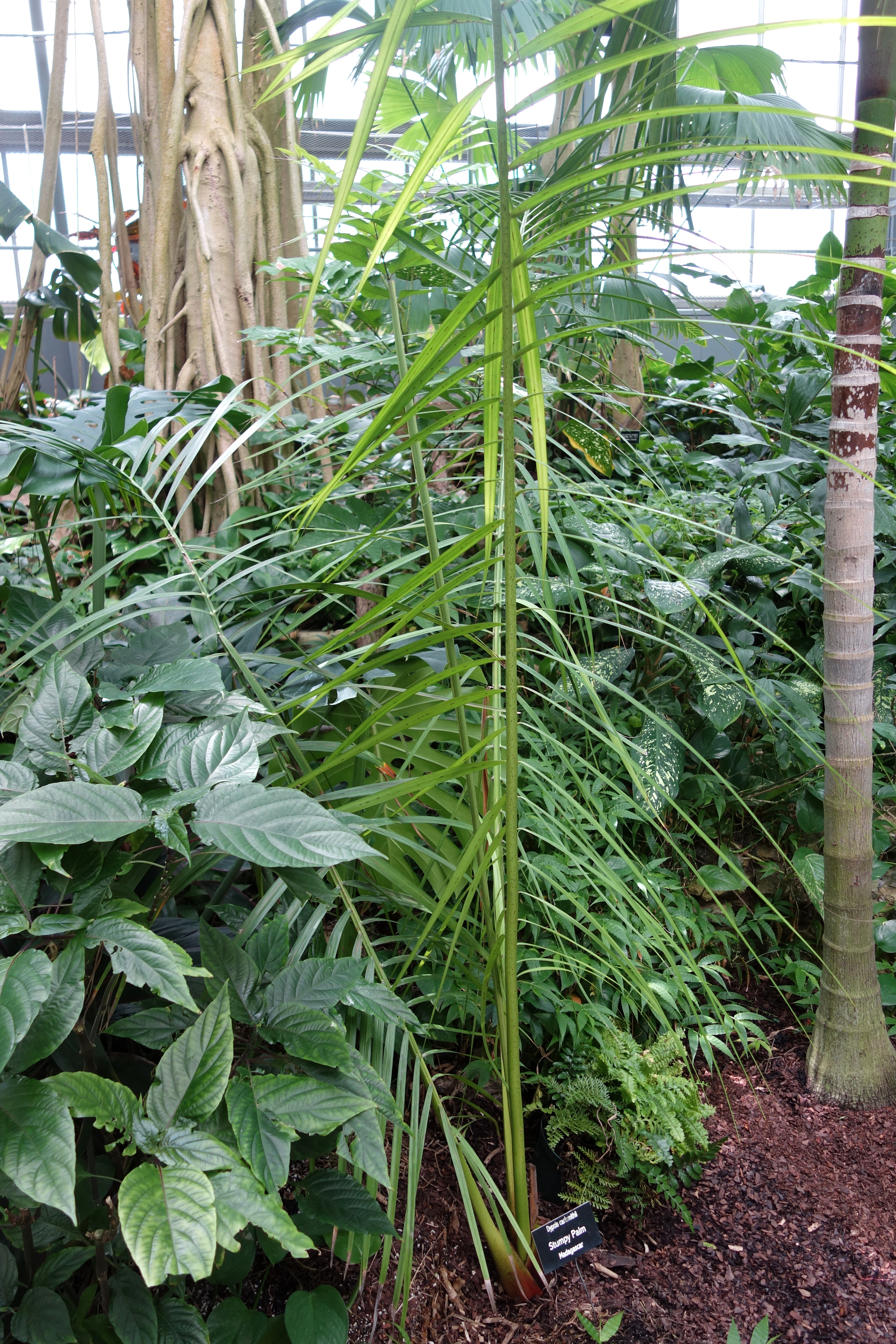

Conservation status
- Critically Endangered (IUCN 3.1)

Scientific classification
- Kingdom: Plantae
- Clade: Tracheophytes
- Clade: Angiosperms
- Clade: Monocots
- Clade: Commelinids
- Order: Arecales
- Family: Arecaceae
- Genus: Chrysalidocarpus
- Species: C. carlsmithii

Binomial name
- Chrysalidocarpus carlsmithii (J.Dransf. & Marcus) Eiserhardt & W.J.Baker

Synonyms
- Dypsis carlsmithii J.Dransf. & Marcus

= Chrysalidocarpus carlsmithii =

Species of palm

Chrysalidocarpus carlsmithii, commonly known as the Carl's palm, is a flowering plant species in the Arecaceae family. It is endemic to the eastern lowland rainforests of Madagascar. It is a rare palm identified with fewer than 15 mature individuals, found in two locations in the northeast: Tampolo on the western coast of Masoala Peninsula, and Mahavelona, north of Toamasina, where it grows at elevations between 20 and 100 meters. The trunk of the Carl's palm grows to 6 m in height and about 40–50 cm in diameter, with mature leaves about 140 cm long and about 80 cm wide.
