= Dypsis singularis =

Conservation status
- Critically Endangered (IUCN 3.1)

Scientific classification
- Kingdom: Plantae
- Clade: Embryophytes
- Clade: Tracheophytes
- Clade: Angiosperms
- Clade: Monocots
- Clade: Commelinids
- Order: Arecales
- Family: Arecaceae
- Genus: Dypsis
- Species: D. singularis

Binomial name
- Dypsis singularis Beentje

Species of flowering plant

Dypsis singularis is a species of flowering plant in the palm family Arecaceae. It is endemic to the island of Madagascar, where it is threatened by habitat loss. It is remarkable for its height to width ratio, the greatest of any tree. It is up to 6 m (20 ft) tall while being only 1 cm (0.39 in) diameter. It is a fairly recent discovery, being unknown to botanists prior to 1995.
