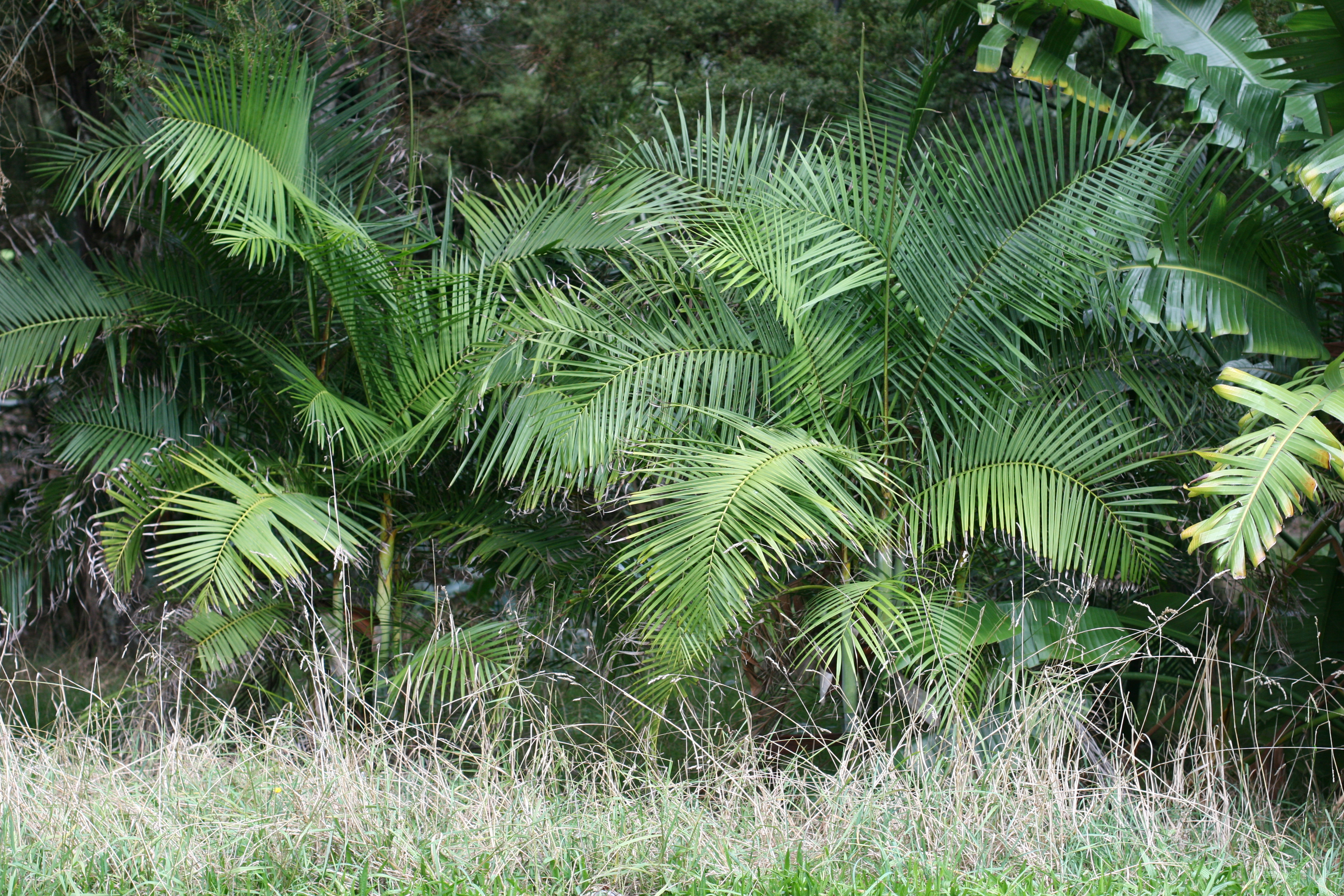

Conservation status
- Least Concern (IUCN 3.1)

Scientific classification
- Kingdom: Plantae
- Clade: Tracheophytes
- Clade: Angiosperms
- Clade: Monocots
- Clade: Commelinids
- Order: Arecales
- Family: Arecaceae
- Genus: Chrysalidocarpus
- Species: C. baronii

Binomial name
- Chrysalidocarpus baronii Becc.

Synonyms
- Chrysalidocarpus propinquus Jum.; Dypsis baronii (Becc.) Beentje & J.Dransf.; Neodypsis baronii (Becc.) Jum.; Neodypsis compacta Jum.

= Chrysalidocarpus baronii =

Species of flowering plant

Chrysalidocarpus baronii is a species of palm tree in the family Arecaceae. It is often known as sugarcane palm because of the scars on its trunks that resemble sugarcane.

== Description ==
Chrysalidocarpus baronii is multi-stemmed and evergreen, growing 2–8 m tall. The stems grow in clusters of 3 to 5, they are 12–22 cm in diameter [unbranched], with a crown of 4 to 8 leaves up to 170 cm long.

== Uses ==
Wild Chrysalidocarpus baronii is harvested for its edible apical bud and for medicinal purposes. it is grown in Antananarivo and elsewhere as an ornamental.

== Distribution ==
It is native to the island of Madagascar.
