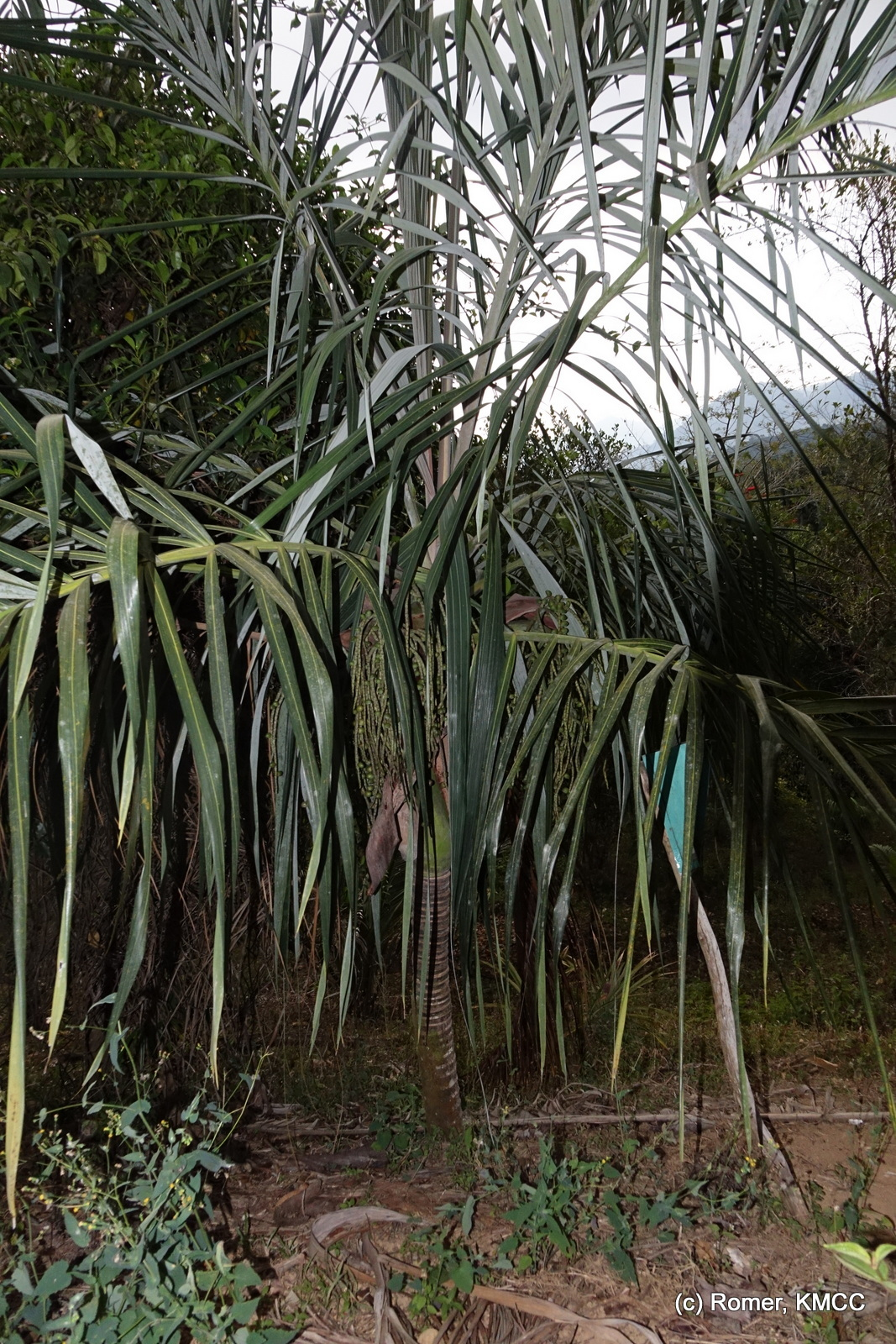

Conservation status
- Critically Endangered (IUCN 3.1)

Scientific classification
- Kingdom: Plantae
- Clade: Embryophytes
- Clade: Tracheophytes
- Clade: Angiosperms
- Clade: Monocots
- Clade: Commelinids
- Order: Arecales
- Family: Arecaceae
- Genus: Chrysalidocarpus
- Species: C. basilongus

Binomial name
- Chrysalidocarpus basilongus (Jum. & H.Perrier) Eiserhardt & W.J.Baker

Synonyms
- Dypsis basilonga (Jum. & H.Perrier) Beentje & J.Dransf.; Neodypsis basilonga Jum. & H.Perrier

= Chrysalidocarpus basilongus =

Species of flowering plant

Chrysalidocarpus basilongus is a species of flowering plant in the family Arecaceae. It is a palm tree endemic to Mount Vatovavy and nearby mountains in southeastern Madagascar. It grows in humid, mossy montane shrubland on flat-topped mountains and rocky slopes from 300 to 1,000 metres (980 to 3,280 ft) elevation. It is threatened by overharvesting.
