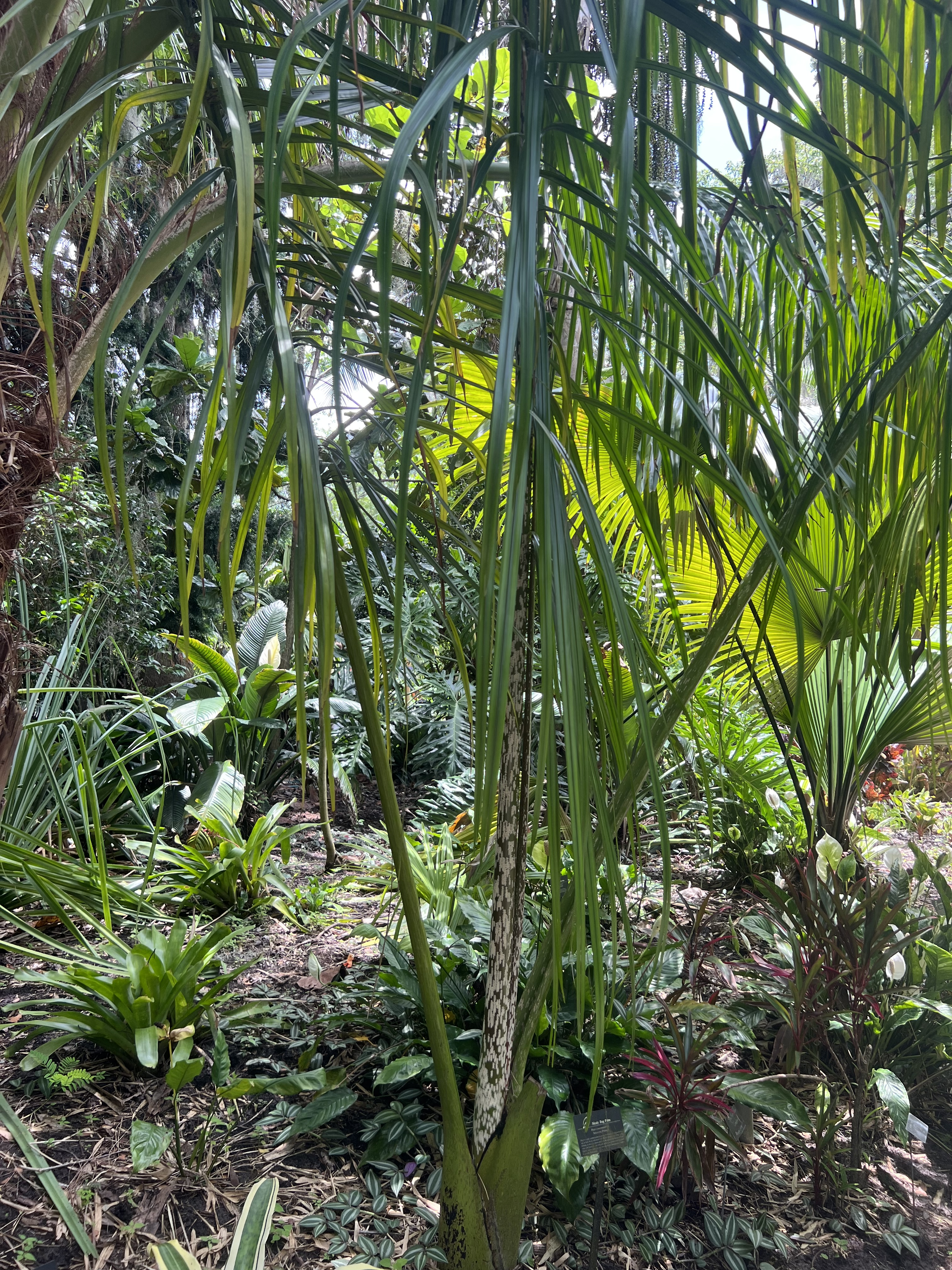

Conservation status
- Near Threatened (IUCN 3.1)

Scientific classification
- Kingdom: Plantae
- Clade: Embryophytes
- Clade: Tracheophytes
- Clade: Angiosperms
- Clade: Monocots
- Clade: Commelinids
- Order: Arecales
- Family: Arecaceae
- Genus: Chrysalidocarpus
- Species: C. mananjarensis

Binomial name
- Chrysalidocarpus mananjarensis Jum. & H.Perrier

Synonyms
- Chrysalidocarpus fibrosus Jum.; Dypsis mananjarensis (Jum. & H.Perrier) Beentje & J.Dransf.

= Chrysalidocarpus mananjarensis =

Species of flowering plant

Chrysalidocarpus mananjarensis is a species of flowering plant in the family Arecaceae. It is a palm tree found only in Madagascar. It is threatened by habitat loss.
