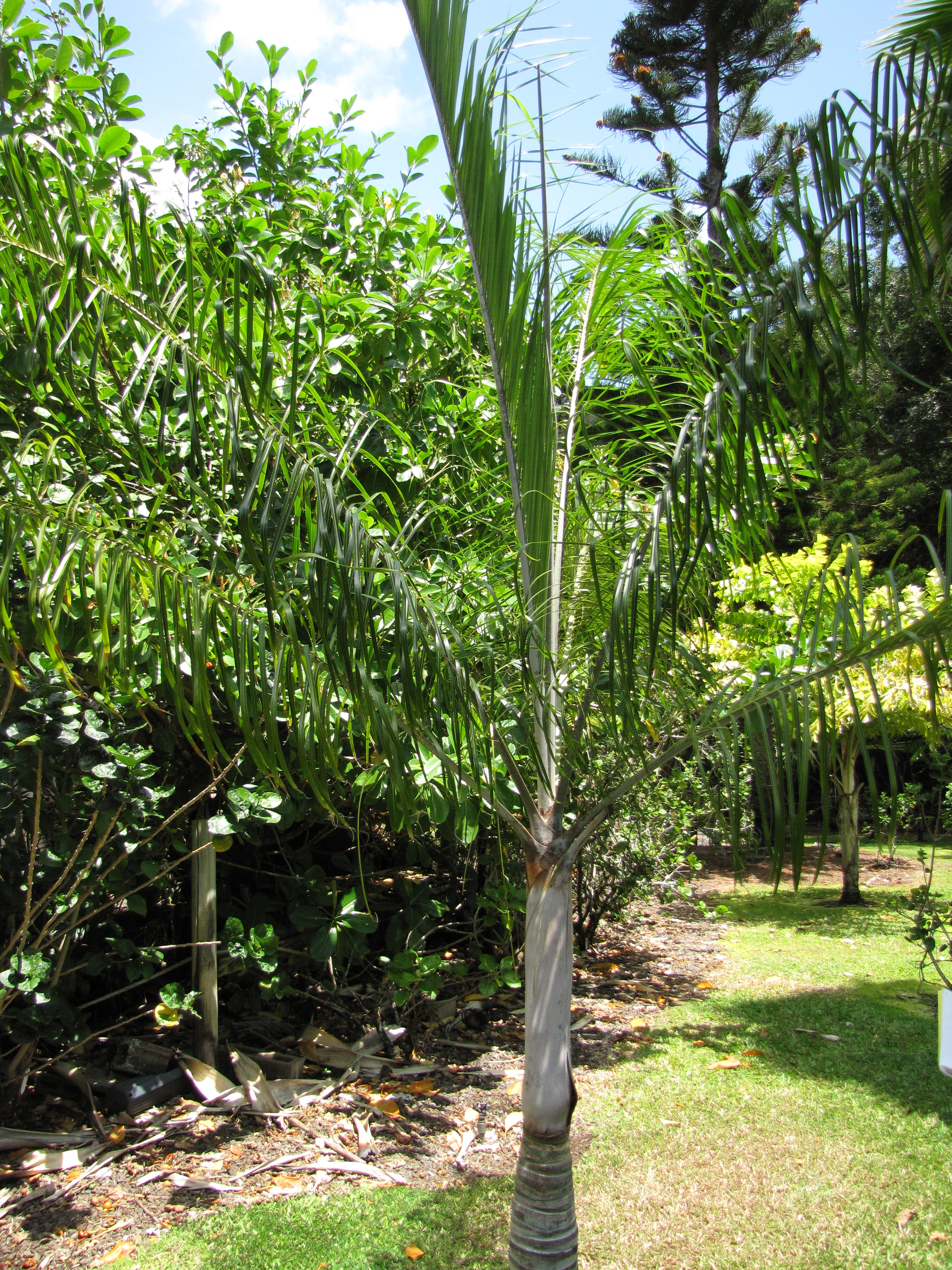

Conservation status
- Critically Endangered (IUCN 3.1)

Scientific classification
- Kingdom: Plantae
- Clade: Embryophytes
- Clade: Tracheophytes
- Clade: Angiosperms
- Clade: Monocots
- Clade: Commelinids
- Order: Arecales
- Family: Arecaceae
- Genus: Chrysalidocarpus
- Species: C. ambositrae

Binomial name
- Chrysalidocarpus ambositrae (Beentje) Eiserhardt & W.J.Baker

Synonyms
- Dypsis ambositrae Beentje

= Chrysalidocarpus ambositrae =

Species of flowering plant

Chrysalidocarpus ambositrae is a species of flowering plant in the family Arecaceae. It is found only in Madagascar where it is threatened by habitat loss.

== Description ==
Chrysalidocarpus ambositrae is an elegant palm that grows a moderately sized, smooth, ringed trunk to about 7 m (23 ft) tall that carries a grayish crownshaft and a crown of gracefully arching, V-shaped leaves with the stiff leaflets drooping at the tip. Generally a solitary palm, but, like many dypsis, often splits and doubles or even triples at or above ground elevation. It usually stays solitary when in regularly burnt terrain. This is a heeled, tillering dypsis.

Trunk: 3–7 meters tall, 12 cm in diameter; internodes 10–20 cm apart, pale brown to grey colored (green and ringed when young), nodal scars 0.5 cm, grey; wood hard; base of stem slightly wider, with some surface roots; slight bulge in upper trunk in one older tree; crownshaft pale waxy grey-green. Crown holds 7-11 leaves, spiral, gracefully arching, with stiff pinnae; crownshaft 64–103 cm. long, pale green with a white bloom, ligules 2 cm.; petiole 3–30 cm. long, 3-6 x 2.2-4.5 cm. in diam., channelled with soft edges; rachis 2.1-2.8 m., in mid-leaf 2.2-3.5 cm. wide, green; pinnae 74-84 on each side of the rachis, grouped only very slightly in 2s-5s, in one plane, the pinnae on opposite sides of the rachis at an angle of roughly 130° +-, stiff with only the apices pendulous, apices attenuate, unequally bifid, the proximal 69-144 x 0.3-1.8 cm., (first interval c. 29 cm., more distal 3.5–9 cm.), median 89-114 x 2.3–3 cm (leaflet interval 0.2–2 cm, group interval 2-3.5 cm), distal 18-58 x 0.8-2.5 cm, abaxially with distant tufts of pale grey ramenta over almost whole length of midrib, with scattered scales very faint to invisible, main veins faint, with only the midrib very prominent on the adaxial surface.

Inflorescence: Interfoliar, branched to 2 (3 in a few cases) orders, with the basal part within the closed sheath, the prophyll hidden and the peduncular bract spreading from the top of the sheath; peduncle 68–123 cm. long, distally 9 x 5 cm. in diam., green, glabrous, curved outside the sheath; prophyll c. 91 cm., borne at 32 cm. above the base of the peduncle, 11.5 cm. wide, narrowly 2-winged; peduncular bract deciduous, about 80 cm., beaked (about 5 cm.) and closed distally, pale waxy grey, inserted about 48 cm. from the base of the peduncle; open peduncular bract 14 x 7 cm.; rachis 84–102 cm., with 23-24 branched and 14-17 unbranched first order branches, in a few cases some of the proximal branches branched twice more, but not more than 3 in the entire inflorescence; all axes green with white bloom; first order branches proximally 2-3 x 0.5–1 cm.; rachillae 14–32 cm., 3–4 mm. in diam., with flattish base and distant to rather dense triads, hardly sunken in slight pits with entire, obtuse or acute bracts. Staminate flowers with sepals 2.2-2.5 x 1.6-2.2 mm., keeled, gibbous at the base, broadly ovate, obtuse, the margins membranous; petals connate for 0.2-0.5 mm., the free lobes 2.8-3 x 2.8-3.2 mm., ovate or elliptic, acute, sometimes with hooded apex; stamens 6, uniseriate, the filaments connate for 0.2-0.5 mm., 2.8-3.2 mm. long, anthers 2.1-2.3 x 1 mm.; pistillode 2.2-2.3 mm., columnar, 0.8–1 mm. in diam. Pistillate flowers with sepals 2.4-3 x 3-4.1 mm., broadly ovate, rounded; petals hardly connate at the base, 3.5-4.1 x 4–5 mm., imbricate but for the apiculate apex, broadly ovate, concave; staminodes 6, 0.3-1.6 mm., narrow and flat; ovary asymmetrical, 2.7-4.8 x 2.8–4 mm., with indistinct pyramidal stigmas. Fruit only known from carbonized remnants, about 14 x 10.5 mm., possibly with fibrous endocarp, possibly with ruminate endosperm.

== Taxonomy ==
The species was first described as Dypsis ambositrae by Henk Jaap Beentje in 1995. In 2022 Wolf L. Eiserhardt and William John Baker placed the species in genus Chrysalidocarpus as C. ambositrae.

With its slightly grouped pinnae, and glabrous inflorescences branched to 2 orders, this species is allied to Chrysalidocarpus gracilis (synonym Dypsis oreophila) and C. tsaratananensis, from which it is easily distinguishable by its larger crownshaft, longer leaves with larger pinnae, the much longer inflorescences, and the larger fruit.

== Distribution and habitat ==
It is native to the Central High Plateau near Ambositra, at 1,300–1,500 m (4,300–4,900 ft) elevation. It grows in open montane forest habitat and plateaus; among rocks or in riverine forest remnants, medium or steep mid slope; where a few plants survive in forest remnants. Recently, it has also been discovered growing in locations shared with Chrysalidocarpus decipiens.

== Conservation notes ==
Conservation status: Critical. In 1992 twelve trees of this species were known, all growing in or next to agricultural areas; in 1994, at least five of these had been cut down or burnt.

== Cultivation and availability ==
This palm has only recently been brought into cultivation. Initial seeds were brought in under the name 'dypsis ambositrae' that turned out to be another species now identified as Chrysalidocarpus plumosus. More recent seed introductions appear to be the real D. ambositrae. This is a palm from the higher elevations of Madagascar and exhibits reasonable adaptation to cool subtropical and mild mediterranean and mild temperate regions of the world. It is hardy to radiational freezes of short duration down to about 27F. Full sun to part shade, tolerates dry atmospheric conditions but requires warm, moist soil conditions. This is a tillering saxophone-style heeled dypsis similar to sabal: plant the heel above ground in well-draining soil to prevent rotting.
