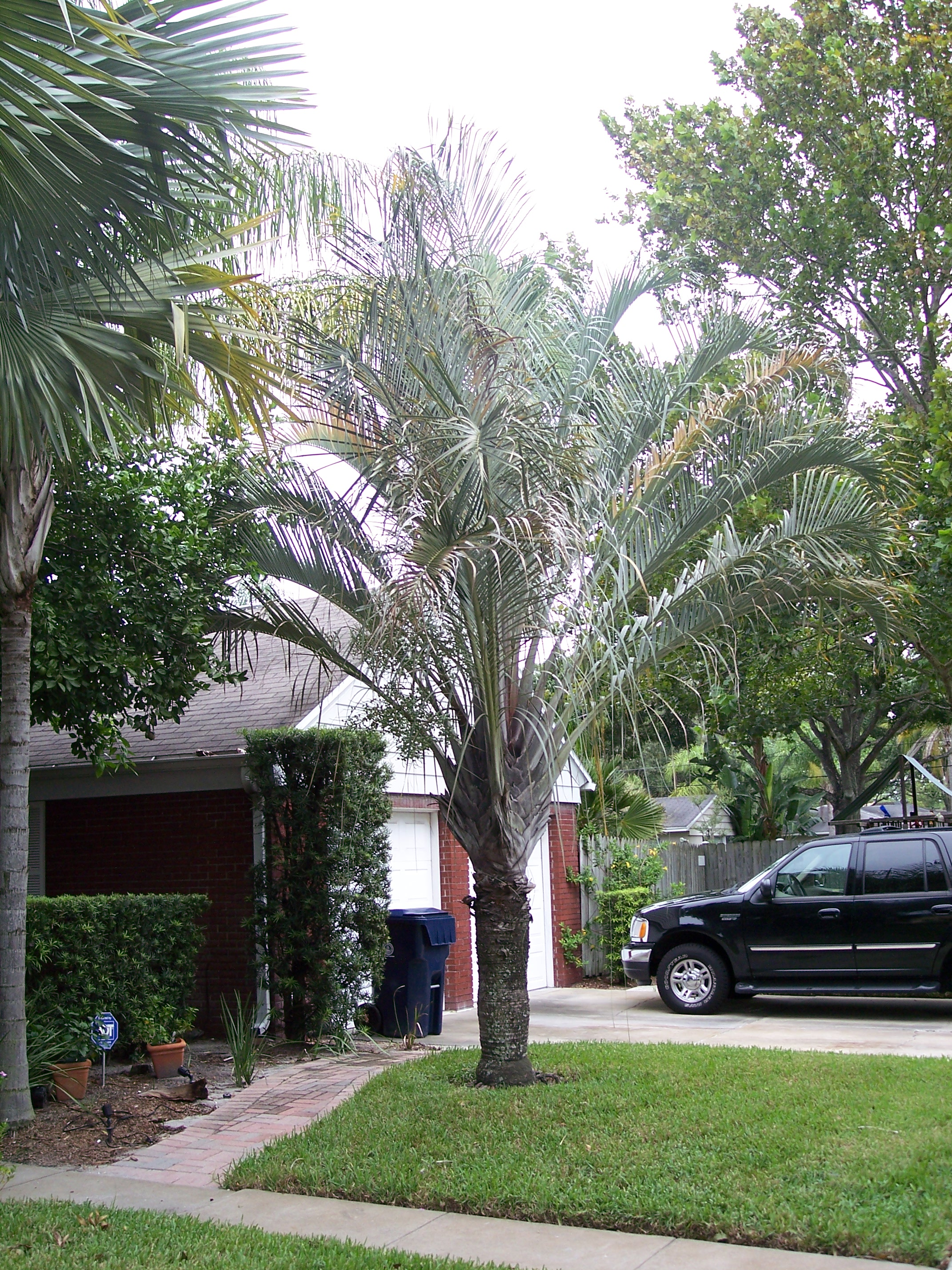

Conservation status
- Vulnerable (IUCN 3.1)
- CITES Appendix II

Scientific classification
- Kingdom: Plantae
- Clade: Embryophytes
- Clade: Tracheophytes
- Clade: Angiosperms
- Clade: Monocots
- Clade: Commelinids
- Order: Arecales
- Family: Arecaceae
- Genus: Chrysalidocarpus
- Species: C. decaryi

Binomial name
- Chrysalidocarpus decaryi (Jum.) Eiserhardt & W.J.Baker

Synonyms
- Dypsis decaryi (Jum.) Beentje & J.Dransf.; Neodypsis decaryi Jum.

= Chrysalidocarpus decaryi =

Species of flowering plant

Chrysalidocarpus decaryi, commonly known as the triangle palm, is a species of flowering plant in the Arecaceae family.

== Naming and taxonomy ==
This species' scientific name is Chrysalidocarpus decaryi and it is a member of the Arecaceae family. Its common name is triangle palm, owing to the triangular shape of the trunk formed by the growth of its fronds.

== Distribution ==
Chrysalidocarpus decaryi is indigenous to the Madagascar rainforest.

== Description ==
Some specimens grow to a height of some 15 metres (49 ft) in the wild; however, it is relatively new to cultivation, so outside its native habitat it rarely achieves anything like that height. It grows well in containers.

The leaves are about 2.5 metres (8 ft 2 in) in length, growing almost upright from the trunk and arching gracefully outward about a metre from their tips. The leaf bases are arranged in three vertical columns set about 120 degrees apart on the main stem, forming a triangular shape in cross section. This shape has given rise to the palm's common name.

The inflorescences branch out from the axils of the lower leaves. They produce yellow and green flowers that later produce round black fruit about 25 millimetres (0.98 in) in diameter.

== Uses ==
The palm is a fine ornamental plant and is most valuable as a specimen tree or accent plant when grown out in the open to display show its remarkable shape to best advantage. In suitable climates it blooms all year. What with its colourful flowers and fruit and shapely habit, it is unusually showy for a palm. It prefers full sun and regular watering, although it is not vulnerable to occasional dryness and partial shade. Over-watering and poor drainage are far greater hazards than drought. For example, the palm is best suited to well drained sandy soil.

Chrysalidocarpus decaryi does not transplant well, so it is a bad choice for commercial field growing. However, it is a fast grower once established, and its seed normally germinates within a month of being planted, so propagation by seed is a good option.

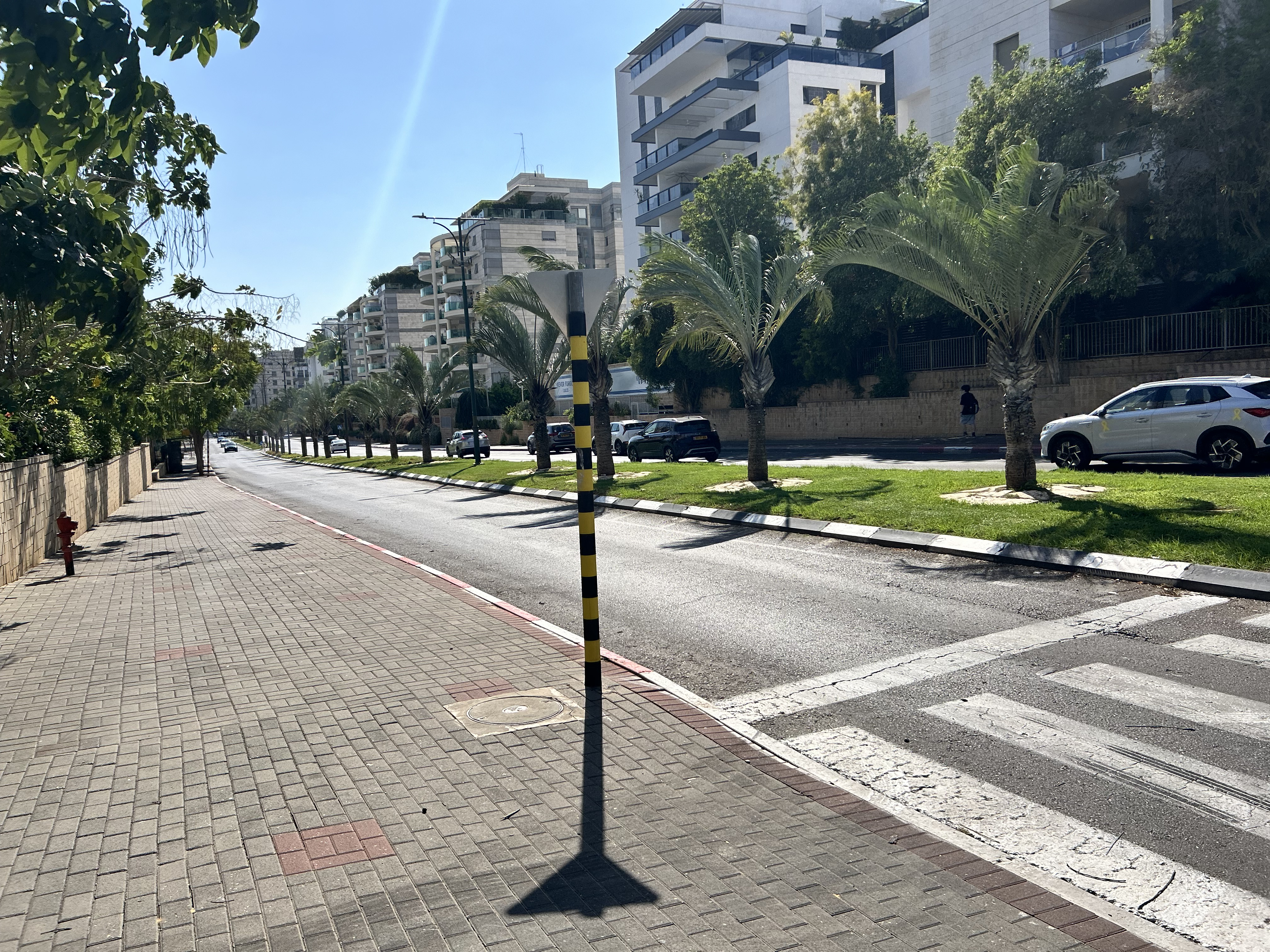
An avenue of triangle palms at Ness Ziona, Israel

== Threatened status ==
Although this species is now commonly cultivated in a variety of climates, there are only about 1,000 individuals left in its native habitat of a small area in Andohahela National Park, southern Madagascar. It is threatened both by fire and the harvesting of its seeds for export.

== Gallery ==
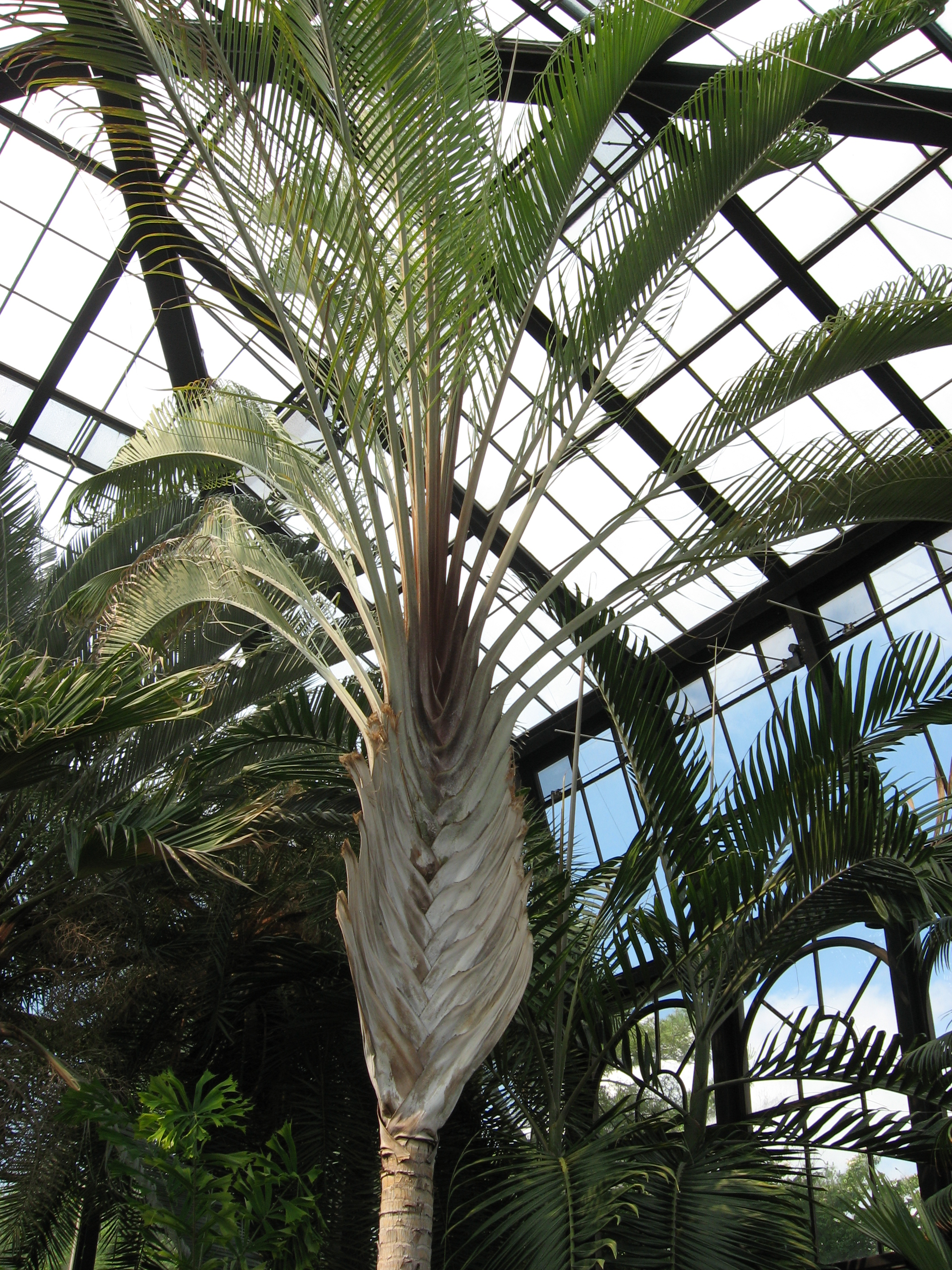

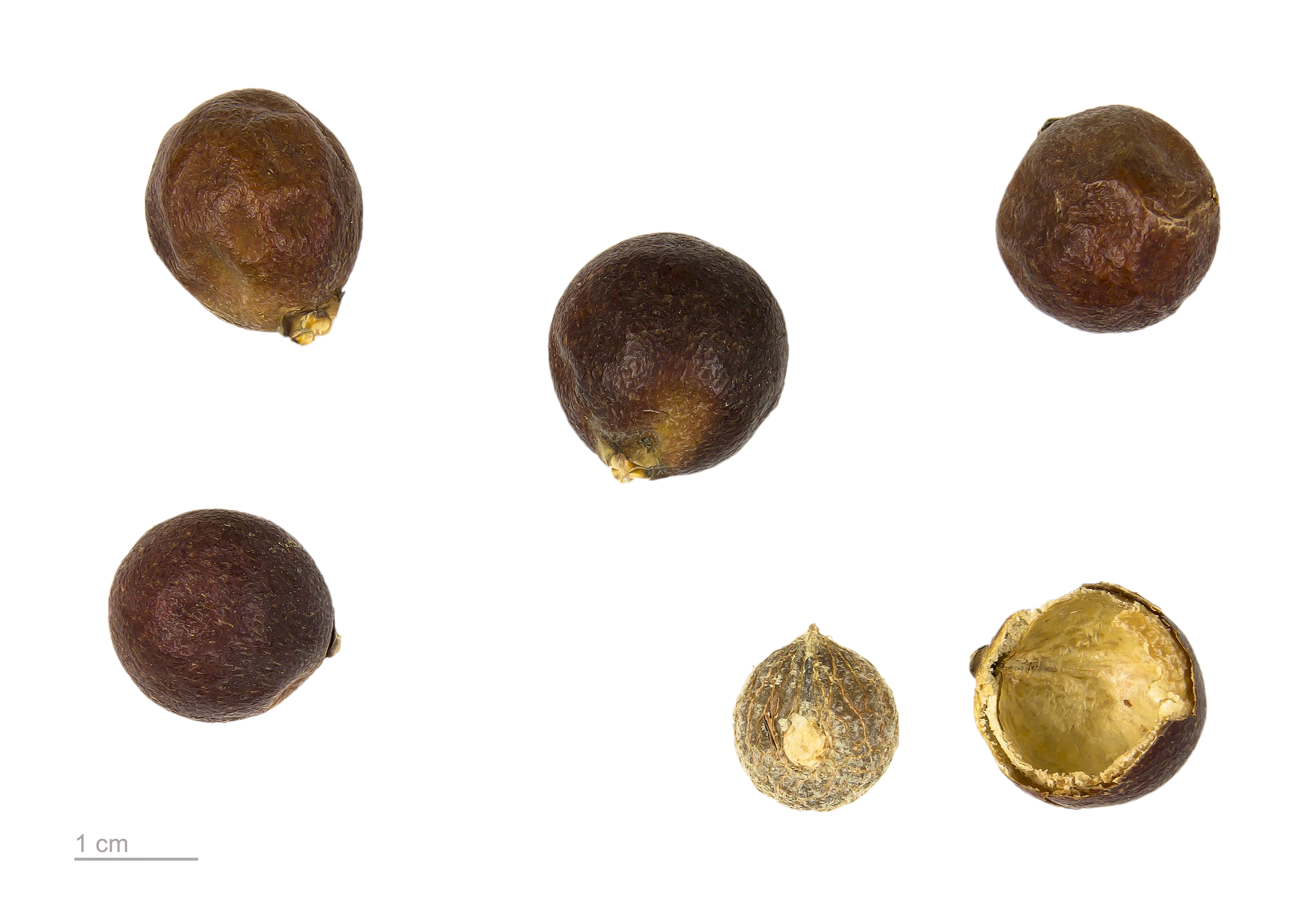
Dypsis decaryi - MHNT

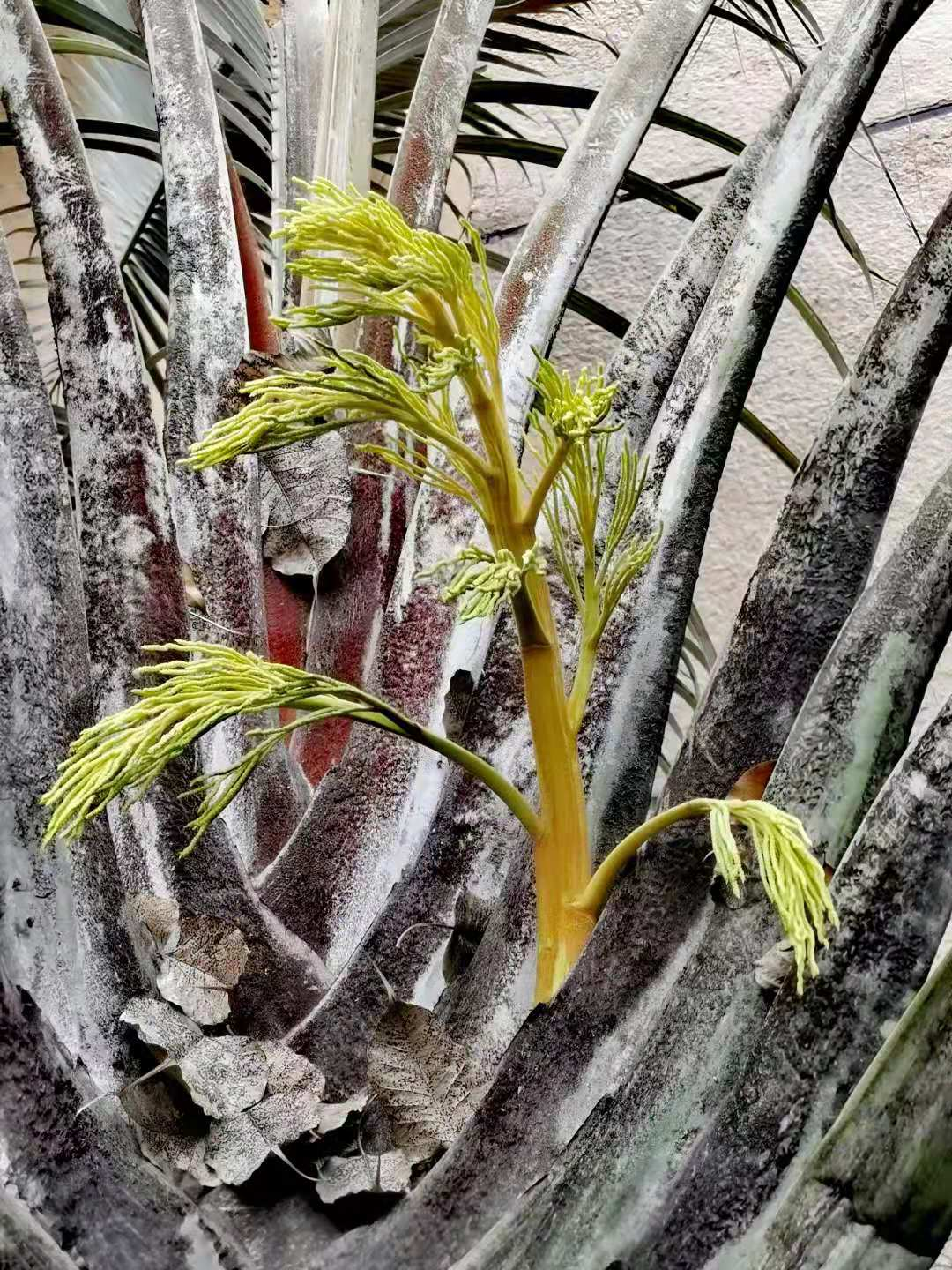
New branch growing from a leaf
