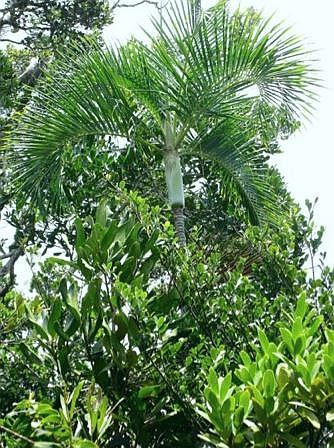

Conservation status
- Critically Endangered (IUCN 3.1)

Scientific classification
- Kingdom: Plantae
- Clade: Embryophytes
- Clade: Tracheophytes
- Clade: Angiosperms
- Clade: Monocots
- Clade: Commelinids
- Order: Arecales
- Family: Arecaceae
- Genus: Chrysalidocarpus
- Species: C. arenarum

Binomial name
- Chrysalidocarpus arenarum Jum.

Synonyms
- Dypsis arenarum (Jum.) Beentje & J.Dransf.

= Chrysalidocarpus arenarum =

Species of flowering plant

Chrysalidocarpus arenarum, Hirihiry is a species of flowering plant in the family Arecaceae. It a palm shrub or tree endemic to east-northeastern Madagascar. It grows in coastal lowland rain forest, often in swampy areas. It is threatened by habitat loss and seed trade.

The species was first described by Henri Lucien Jumelle in 1922.
