= Chrysalidocarpus canaliculatus =

Conservation status
- Critically Endangered (IUCN 3.1)

Scientific classification
- Kingdom: Plantae
- Clade: Embryophytes
- Clade: Tracheophytes
- Clade: Angiosperms
- Clade: Monocots
- Clade: Commelinids
- Order: Arecales
- Family: Arecaceae
- Genus: Chrysalidocarpus
- Species: C. canaliculatus

Binomial name
- Chrysalidocarpus canaliculatus (Jum.) Eiserhardt & W.J.Baker

Synonyms
- Dypsis canaliculata (Jum.) Beentje & J.Dransf.; Neodypsis canaliculata Jum.

Species of flowering plant

Chrysalidocarpus canaliculatus is a species of flowering plant in the family Arecaceae. It is found only in Madagascar, where it is thought that fewer than 10 individual plants exist. It was previously collected from two disjunct populations, one in Manongarivo and one in Ampasimanolotra. Both were growing on sandstone in lowland rain forest. In 2001 another small population was discovered in Zahamena National Park, and this is now the only known surviving group. To date no flowers from C. canaliculatus have ever been collected for science.

== Taxonomy ==
This species was first described as Neodypsis canaliculata in 1924 by the French botanist Henri Lucien Jumelle in the journal Annales du Muśee colonial de Marseille. It was renamed Dypsis canaliculata in 1995 by Henk Jaap Beentje and John Dransfield, published in their work The Palms of Madagascar. In 2022 Wolf L. Eiserhardt and William John Baker placed the species in genus Chrysalidocarpus as C. canaliculatus.
