= Chrysalidocarpus ambanjae =

Conservation status
- Critically Endangered (IUCN 3.1)

Scientific classification
- Kingdom: Plantae
- Clade: Embryophytes
- Clade: Tracheophytes
- Clade: Angiosperms
- Clade: Monocots
- Clade: Commelinids
- Order: Arecales
- Family: Arecaceae
- Genus: Chrysalidocarpus
- Species: C. ambanjae

Binomial name
- Chrysalidocarpus ambanjae (Beentje) Eiserhardt & W.J.Baker

Synonyms
- Dypsis ambanjae Beentje; Phloga sambiranensis Jum.

Species of flowering plant

Chrysalidocarpus ambanjae is a species of flowering plant in the family Arecaceae, endemic to rain forests of northwestern Madagascar. The last specimen was collected more than 80 years ago, and it may be extinct.

The species was first described as Phloga sambiranensis in 1933 by Henri Lucien Jumelle. In 1995 it was published under the name Dypsis ambanjae by Henk Jaap Beentje. In 2022 Wolf L. Eiserhardt and William John Baker placed the species in genus Chrysalidocarpus as C. ambanjae.
