= Chrysalidocarpus tsaravoasira =

Conservation status
- Vulnerable (IUCN 3.1)

Scientific classification
- Kingdom: Plantae
- Clade: Embryophytes
- Clade: Tracheophytes
- Clade: Angiosperms
- Clade: Monocots
- Clade: Commelinids
- Order: Arecales
- Family: Arecaceae
- Genus: Chrysalidocarpus
- Species: C. tsaravoasira

Binomial name
- Chrysalidocarpus tsaravoasira (Beentje) Eiserhardt & W.J.Baker

Synonyms
- Dypsis tsaravoasira Beentje

Species of flowering plant

Chrysalidocarpus tsaravoasira is a species of flowering plant in the Arecaceae family. It is a palm endemic to Madagascar, where it grows in lowland and lower montane rain forests up from 40 to 1,200 meters (130 to 3,940 ft) elevation. There are perhaps 500 plants remaining, and the population is decreasing due to overharvest.

The species was first described as Dypsis tsaravoasira by Henk Jaap Beentje in 1995. In 2022 Wolf L. Eiserhardt and William John Baker placed the species in genus Chrysalidocarpus as C. tsaravoasira.
