= Chrysalidocarpus hovomantsina =

Conservation status
- Critically Endangered (IUCN 3.1)

Scientific classification
- Kingdom: Plantae
- Clade: Embryophytes
- Clade: Tracheophytes
- Clade: Angiosperms
- Clade: Monocots
- Clade: Commelinids
- Order: Arecales
- Family: Arecaceae
- Genus: Chrysalidocarpus
- Species: C. hovomantsina

Binomial name
- Chrysalidocarpus hovomantsina (Beentje) Eiserhardt & W.J.Baker

Synonyms
- Dypsis hovomantsina Beentje

Species of flowering plant

Chrysalidocarpus hovomantsina is a species of flowering plant in the family Arecaceae. It is a palm endemic to northeastern Madagascar. It is known from five separate sites between Analalava (north of Toamasina) and the Masoala Peninsula, where it grows in lowland rain forest, typically mid-slope or near valley bottoms from 50 to 600 meters (160 to 1,970 ft) elevation. It is threatened by habitat loss.

The species was first described as Dypsis hovomantsina by Henk Jaap Beentje in 1995. In 2022 Wolf L. Eiserhardt and William John Baker placed the species in genus Chrysalidocarpus as C. hovomantsina.
