= Chrysalidocarpus nauseosus =

Conservation status
- Critically Endangered (IUCN 3.1)

Scientific classification
- Kingdom: Plantae
- Clade: Embryophytes
- Clade: Tracheophytes
- Clade: Angiosperms
- Clade: Monocots
- Clade: Commelinids
- Order: Arecales
- Family: Arecaceae
- Genus: Chrysalidocarpus
- Species: C. nauseosus

Binomial name
- Chrysalidocarpus nauseosus (Jum. & H.Perrier) Eiserhardt & W.J.Baker

Synonyms
- Dypsis nauseosa (Jum. & H.Perrier) Beentje & J.Dransf.; Neodypsis nauseosa Jum. & H.Perrier

Species of flowering plant

Chrysalidocarpus nauseosus is a species of flowering plant in the family Arecaceae. It a palm native to southeastern Madagascar. It is threatened by habitat loss.

The species epithet comes from the bitter taste of its heart, the terminal bud itself causes severe vomiting if consumed. Its wood is used to build roofing beams, floorboards and blowguns.
