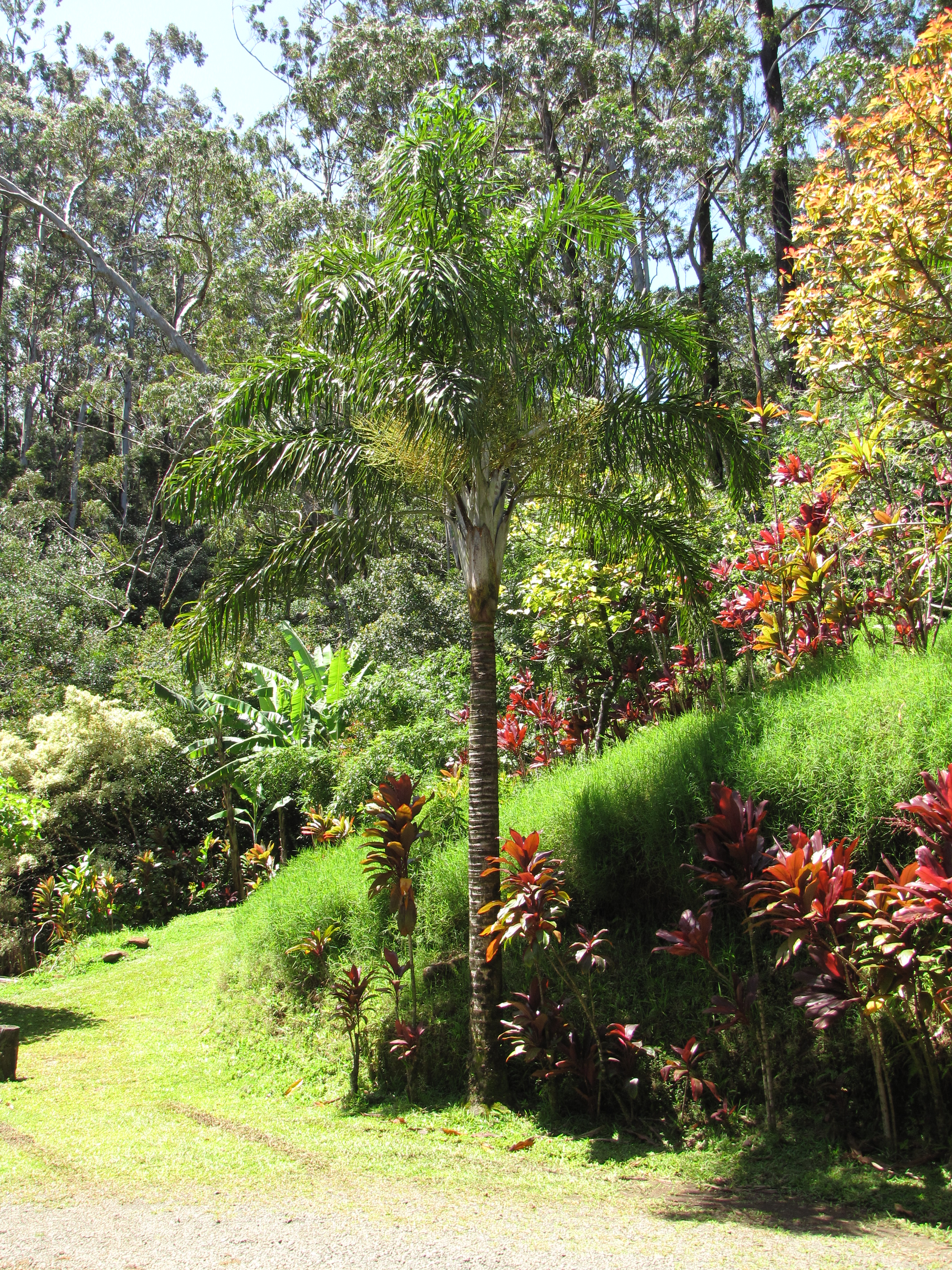

Conservation status
- Least Concern (IUCN 3.1)

Scientific classification
- Kingdom: Plantae
- Clade: Embryophytes
- Clade: Tracheophytes
- Clade: Angiosperms
- Clade: Monocots
- Clade: Commelinids
- Order: Arecales
- Family: Arecaceae
- Genus: Chrysalidocarpus
- Species: C. madagascariensis

Binomial name
- Chrysalidocarpus madagascariensis (D.T.Fish) Becc.

Synonyms
- Areca madagascariensis Regel: Chrysalidocarpus lucubensis Becc.; Chrysalidocarpus madagascariensis Becc.; Chrysalidocarpus madagascariensis var. lucubensis (Becc.) Jum.; Chrysalidocarpus madagascariensis f. oleraceus (Jum. & H.Perrier) Jum.; Chrysalidocarpus madagascariensis var. oleraceus (Jum. & H.Perrier) Jum.; Chrysalidocarpus oleraceus Jum. & H.Perrier; Dypsis madagascariensis D.T.Fish; Dypsis madagascariensis (Becc.) Beentje & J.Dransf.

= Chrysalidocarpus madagascariensis =

Species of flowering plant

Chrysalidocarpus madagascariensis (commonly known as the lucuba palm) is a species of flowering plant in the family Arecaceae. It is a palm tree endemic to northern and western Madagascar, where it grows in lowland rain forest. It is threatened by habitat loss.
