= Chrysalidocarpus gracilis =

Conservation status
- Vulnerable (IUCN 3.1)

Scientific classification
- Kingdom: Plantae
- Clade: Embryophytes
- Clade: Tracheophytes
- Clade: Angiosperms
- Clade: Monocots
- Clade: Commelinids
- Order: Arecales
- Family: Arecaceae
- Genus: Chrysalidocarpus
- Species: C. gracilis

Binomial name
- Chrysalidocarpus gracilis (Jum.) Eiserhardt & W.J.Baker

Synonyms
- Dypsis oreophila Beentje; Neodypsis gracilis Jum.; Phloga gracilis (Jum.) H.Perrier

Species of flowering plant

Chrysalidocarpus gracilis is a species of flowering plant in the family Arecaceae. It is a palm native to northern and northeastern Madagascar, where it ranges from Andilamena to Tsaratanana. It grows in lowland and montane rain forests, most commonly in mossy forest with a relatively low and slightly open canopy, from 500 to 1,700 metres (1,600 to 5,600 ft) elevation. It is threatened by habitat loss.

The species was first described as Neodypsis gracilis by Henri Lucien Jumelle in 1933. In 1995 Henk Jaap Beentje placed the species in genus Dypsis as D. oreophila ("mountain-loving"), since the name D. gracilis had previously been applied to another species. In 2022 Wolf L. Eiserhardt and William John Baker placed the species in genus Chrysalidocarpus as C. gracilis.
