= Chrysalidocarpus bejofo =

Conservation status
- Vulnerable (IUCN 3.1)

Scientific classification
- Kingdom: Plantae
- Clade: Embryophytes
- Clade: Tracheophytes
- Clade: Angiosperms
- Clade: Monocots
- Clade: Commelinids
- Order: Arecales
- Family: Arecaceae
- Genus: Chrysalidocarpus
- Species: C. bejofo

Binomial name
- Chrysalidocarpus bejofo (Beentje) Eiserhardt & W.J.Baker

Synonyms
- Dypsis bejofo Beentje

Species of flowering plant

Chrysalidocarpus bejofo is a species of flowering plant in the Arecaceae family. It is a palm endemic to northeastern Madagascar. It grows on hilltops and slopes in rainforest habitat. The species is threatened by overcollection of seeds and by habitat loss. There may be only about 300 mature individuals remaining. Some grow in protected areas.

This kind of palm tree has been confused with another type of palm, which was initially called Dypsis sp. Bejofa. Now this kind is called as Dypsis sp. 'Bejofa'. Despite the fact that the names have changed because of the similarity in the names, there is still confusion, even though, their appearances are different.
