= Chrysalidocarpus ligulatus =

Conservation status
- Data Deficient (IUCN 3.1)

Scientific classification
- Kingdom: Plantae
- Clade: Embryophytes
- Clade: Tracheophytes
- Clade: Angiosperms
- Clade: Monocots
- Clade: Commelinids
- Order: Arecales
- Family: Arecaceae
- Genus: Chrysalidocarpus
- Species: C. ligulatus

Binomial name
- Chrysalidocarpus ligulatus (Jum.) Eiserhardt & W.J.Baker

Synonyms
- Dypsis ligulata (Jum.) Beentje & J.Dransf.; Neodypsis ligulata Jum.

Species of flowering plant

Chrysalidocarpus ligulatus is a species of flowering plant in the family Arecaceae. It is a palm native to northwestern Madagascar. It is threatened by habitat loss.

== Description ==
Chrysalidocarpus ligulatus is a single-stemmed evergreen palm growing 4–8 metres (13–26 ft) tall. The unbranched stem can be 15 cm or more in diameter, topped by a crown of leaves. The plant is harvested from the wild for local use as a food and medicine.

== Range and habitat ==
Chrysalidocarpus ligulatus is endemic to the Sambirano region of northwestern Madagascar. It is known only from a single location at the base of Mont Kalabenono, in the Ambilobe area. It grows in humid forest on sandstone substrate at 100 metres (330 ft) elevation.

== Conservation and threats ==
There is insufficient data to assess the status of this species. It has not been seen in the wild since 1923 and the humid forest at Ambilobe has not been well surveyed. The plant is classified as 'Data Deficient' in the IUCN Red List of Threatened Species (2011).
