= Chrysalidocarpus ifanadianae =

Conservation status
- Critically Endangered (IUCN 3.1)

Scientific classification
- Kingdom: Plantae
- Clade: Embryophytes
- Clade: Tracheophytes
- Clade: Angiosperms
- Clade: Monocots
- Clade: Commelinids
- Order: Arecales
- Family: Arecaceae
- Genus: Chrysalidocarpus
- Species: C. ifanadianae

Binomial name
- Chrysalidocarpus ifanadianae (Beentje) Eiserhardt & W.J.Baker

Synonyms
- Dypsis ifanadianae Beentje

Species of flowering plant

Chrysalidocarpus ifanadianae is a species of flowering plant in the family Arecaceae. It is a palm endemic to Madagascar. It is native to the area around Ifanadiana in eastern Madagascar, where it grows in lowland rain forest, generally on steep slopes between 200 and 500 meters (660 and 1,640 ft) elevation.

It is threatened by habitat loss. Fewer than 50 individuals are known, and the IUCN Red List assesses the species as Critically Endangered.

The species was first described as Dypsis ifanadianae by Henk Jaap Beentje in 1995. In 2022 Wolf L. Eiserhardt and William John Baker placed the species in genus Chrysalidocarpus as C. ifanadianae.
