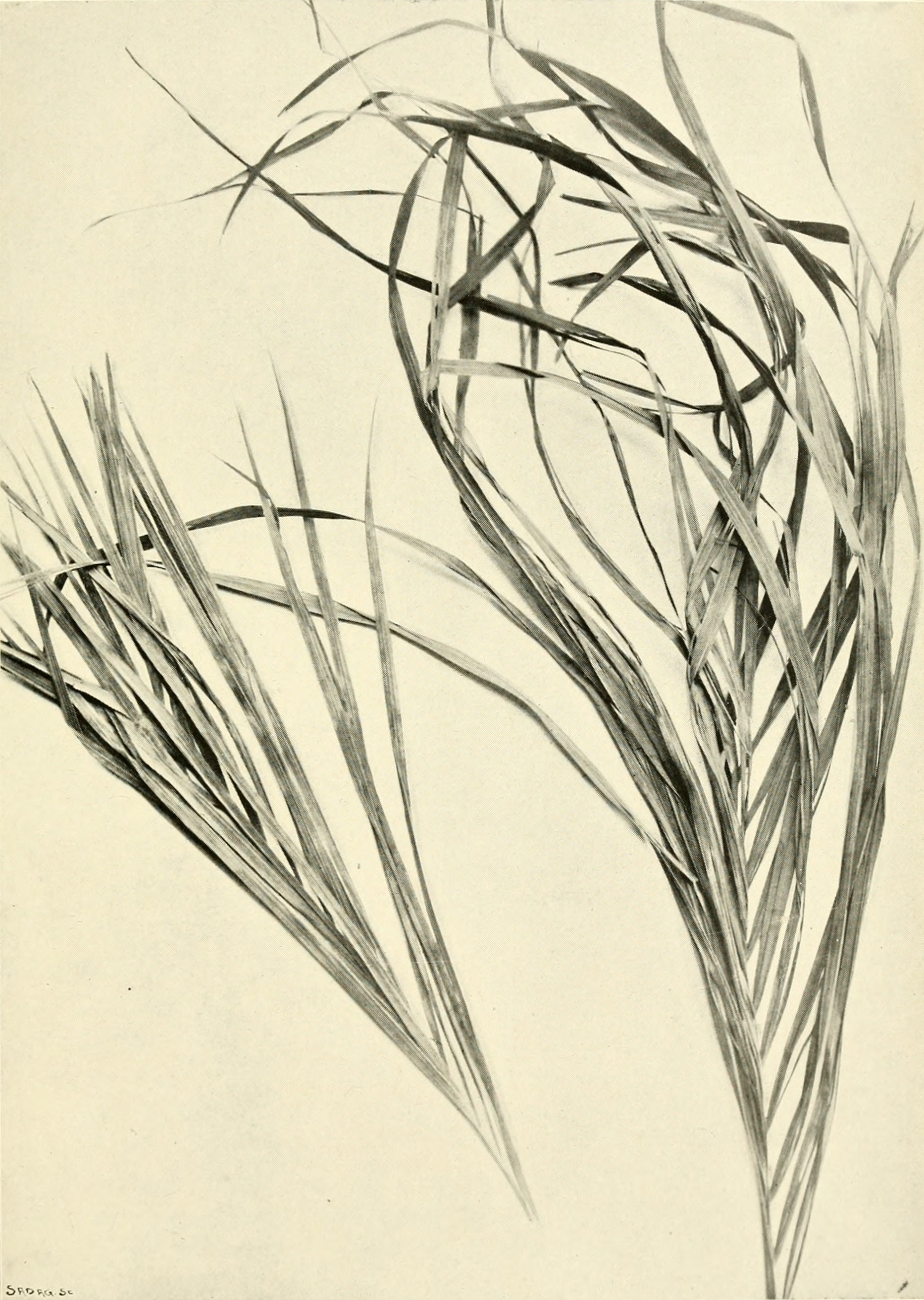

Conservation status
- Data Deficient (IUCN 3.1)

Scientific classification
- Kingdom: Plantae
- Clade: Embryophytes
- Clade: Tracheophytes
- Clade: Angiosperms
- Clade: Monocots
- Clade: Commelinids
- Order: Arecales
- Family: Arecaceae
- Genus: Chrysalidocarpus
- Species: C. canescens

Binomial name
- Chrysalidocarpus canescens Jum. & H.Perrier

Synonyms
- Dypsis canescens (Jum. & H.Perrier) Beentje & J.Dransf.

= Chrysalidocarpus canescens =

Species of flowering plant

Chrysalidocarpus canescens, also known as Dypsis canescens, is a species of flowering plant in the family Arecaceae. It is endemic to the Sambirano region of northwestern Madagascar. It was identified in 1913. It is probably extinct, given that it has not been seen for half a century.
