= Chrysalidocarpus heteromorphus =

Conservation status
- Data Deficient (IUCN 3.1)

Scientific classification
- Kingdom: Plantae
- Clade: Embryophytes
- Clade: Tracheophytes
- Clade: Angiosperms
- Clade: Monocots
- Clade: Commelinids
- Order: Arecales
- Family: Arecaceae
- Genus: Chrysalidocarpus
- Species: C. heteromorphus

Binomial name
- Chrysalidocarpus heteromorphus (Jum.) Eiserhardt & W.J.Baker

Synonyms
- Dypsis heteromorpha (Jum.) Beentje & J.Dransf.; Neodypsis heteromorpha Jum.

Species of flowering plant

Chrysalidocarpus heteromorphus is a species of flowering plant in the family Arecaceae. It is a palm endemic to northern Madagascar. It is native to the Marojejy and Tsaratanana massifs, where it grows in montane rain forest from 900 to 1,700 metres (3,000 to 5,600 ft) elevation. It is threatened by habitat loss.
