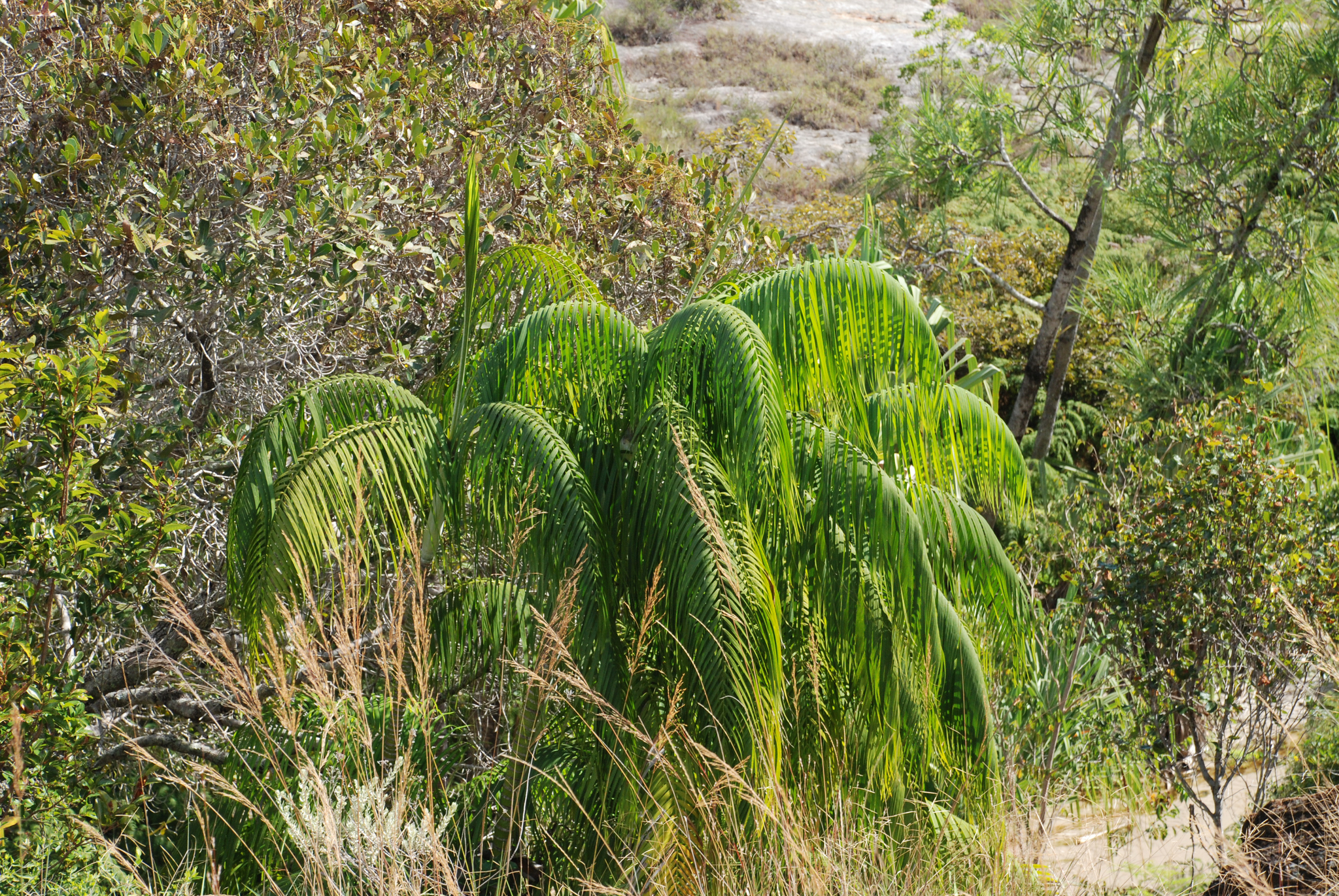

Conservation status
- Vulnerable (IUCN 3.1)

Scientific classification
- Kingdom: Plantae
- Clade: Embryophytes
- Clade: Tracheophytes
- Clade: Angiosperms
- Clade: Monocots
- Clade: Commelinids
- Order: Arecales
- Family: Arecaceae
- Genus: Chrysalidocarpus
- Species: C. onilahensis

Binomial name
- Chrysalidocarpus onilahensis Jum. & H.Perrier

Synonyms
- Chrysalidocarpus brevinodis H.Perrier; Chrysalidocarpus midongensis Jum.; Dypsis onilahensis (Jum. & H.Perrier) Beentje & J.Dransf.

= Chrysalidocarpus onilahensis =

Species of flowering plant

Dypsis onilahensis is a species of palm tree in the family Arecaceae. It is endemic to Madagascar as is reflected in the species name (onilahensis) referring to the Onilahy River, south of Toliara. It is threatened by habitat loss.

== Description ==
Chrysalidocarpus onilahensis is a pinnate leaved, clustering palm typically growing in clusters of 3–10 trees with adult trees in ideal conditions growing to 10–20 m (33–66 ft) high in height with stems of around 15 cm (5.9 in) in diameter. Stems are typically grey at the base and dark green towards the crown with ringed bands and surrounding the circumference of the stem. Leaves grow up to 2 m (6 ft 7 in) in length with up to 70 pinnae (leaflets) of 30 cm (12 in) or more and arch pendulously downwards giving the palm a graceful weeping appearance.

== Habitat ==
Chrysalidocarpus onilahensis is native to northwestern and western Madagascar as well as south-central Madagascar. In the northern part of its range it may be found growing in riverine forest at between 50–300 m (160–980 ft) elevation, and between 750–2,400 m (2,460–7,870 ft) in riverine or evergreen forest remnants in the central mountains and southern parts of its range.

== Conservation ==
It is classed as vulnerable in the wild. Although its potential native range is large the habitat is prone to destruction by fire. Numbers are estimated at less than a thousand. A population in the Isalo National Park is well-protected, but numbers less than a few hundred individuals. Outside of Madagascar C. onilahensis is fairly common in cultivation in sub-tropical and warm temperate climates including South Africa, California, southern Florida and Australia.
