= Chrysalidocarpus ovobontsira =

Conservation status
- Critically Endangered (IUCN 3.1)

Scientific classification
- Kingdom: Plantae
- Clade: Embryophytes
- Clade: Tracheophytes
- Clade: Angiosperms
- Clade: Monocots
- Clade: Commelinids
- Order: Arecales
- Family: Arecaceae
- Genus: Chrysalidocarpus
- Species: C. ovobontsira

Binomial name
- Chrysalidocarpus ovobontsira (Beentje) Eiserhardt & W.J.Baker

Synonyms
- Dypsis ovobontsira Beentje

Species of flowering plant

Chrysalidocarpus ovobontsira is a species of flowering plant in the family Arecaceae. It is a palm tree found only in northeastern Madagascar. It is known only from the Antanambe forest in Mananara Avaratra, where it grows in lowland rain forest on ultramafic soil from 300 to 400 meters (980 to 1,310 ft) elevation. Fewer than ten individuals have been recorded, and the IUCN Red List assesses the species as Critically Endangered.

The species was first described as Dypsis ovobontsira by Henk Jaap Beentje in 1995. In 2022 Wolf L. Eiserhardt and William John Baker placed the species in genus Chrysalidocarpus as C. ovobontsira.
