= Chrysalidocarpus loucoubensis =

Conservation status
- Critically Endangered (IUCN 3.1)

Scientific classification
- Kingdom: Plantae
- Clade: Tracheophytes
- Clade: Angiosperms
- Clade: Monocots
- Clade: Commelinids
- Order: Arecales
- Family: Arecaceae
- Genus: Chrysalidocarpus
- Species: C. loucoubensis

Binomial name
- Chrysalidocarpus loucoubensis (Jum.) Eiserhardt & W.J.Baker

Synonyms
- Dypsis ampasindavae Beentje; Neodypsis loucoubensis Jum.

Species of palm

Chrysalidocarpus loucoubensis, synonym Dypsis ampasindavae is a species of palm tree. It is endemic to Madagascar. It is native to the Sambirano region of northwestern Madagascar, where it is found in subhumid lowland forest from sea level to 300 metres elevation. It is known from only two locations, and there are fewer than 30 mature individuals between them.
