= Sainte Luce Reserve =

- Location within Madagascar
- Location: municipality of Mahatalaky, village: Manafiafy - southern Madagascar
- Nearest city: Tolagnaro (Fort Dauphin)
- Coordinates: 24°48′10″S 47°09′49″E
- Area: 0.4 km^{2} (0.15 sq mi)
- Established: 2009
- Visitors: approx. 50 (in 2016)
- Governing body: Association Filana

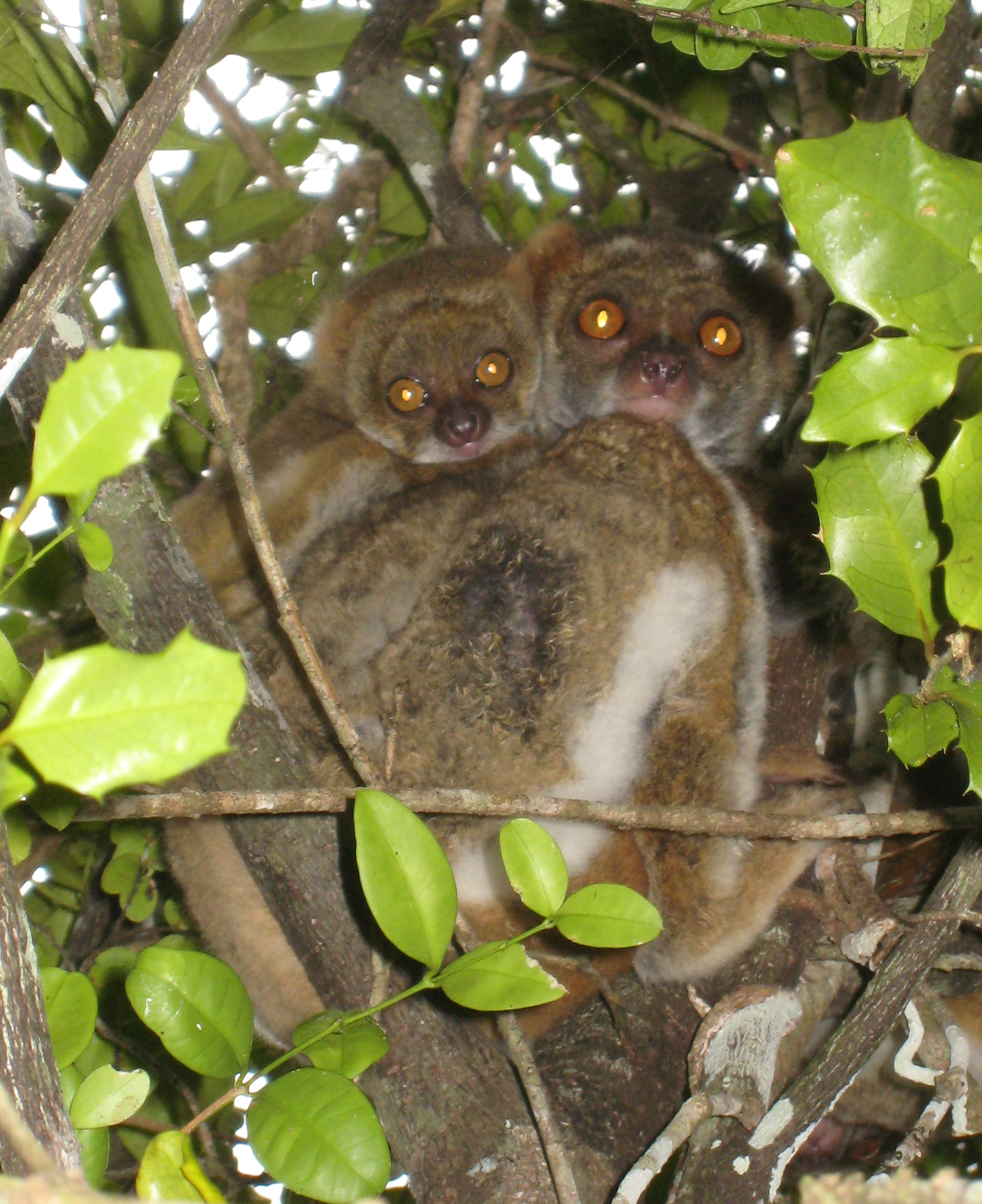
Avahi laniger

Sainte Luce Reserve is a nature reserve in south-east Madagascar and part of one of the last remaining intact coastal rainforests in the country. The reserve is private, and has been managed by the Filana Association since 2010. It forms part of the greater Sainte Luce rainforest, which is approximately 15 km (9.3 mi) long and varies from 100 to 700 m (330 to 2,300 ft) wide. The reserve itself is approximately 1 km (0.62 mi) long and averages 300 m (980 ft) across.

== Flora and fauna ==
The reserve is within a Pandanus dominated coastal rainforest which is home to a fascinating variety of plant and animal species.

The reserve includes enclaves of rare ebony (Diospyros) forest growing on white sand, and river mangroves.

There are five species of lemur, including the Collared brown lemur (Eulemur collaris) which was first sighted at the reserve in 1990 and can only be found in this area of Madagascar.

The reserve is also home to the Sainte Luce mouse lemur (Microcebus saintelucei). However, because the Sainte Luce Reserve forest is separated from the other Sainte Luce forests by rivers, there is a current belief that the mouse lemur here is an entirely new, as yet unclassified, species. The other nocturnal lemurs that reside in the reserve include the Fat-tailed dwarf lemur (Cheirogaleus medius), and Southern woolly lemur (Avahi meridionalis).

There are also at least 50 species of reptile, 50 bird species and 200 tree species, the majority of which are endemic.

There is also a huge diversity of land snails, 98% of which are endemic to Madagascar.

The reserve is also one of only four locations in Madagascar to be home to the endangered palm tree Dypsis saintelucei, of which only 300 mature individuals remain. The palm has been felled for materials to construct lobster traps to supply the nearby hotels, and also lies in the habitat where ilmenite ore mining is taking place.

== Threats to the rainforest ==
The littoral rainforests in this region are threatened by deforestation and shifting agricultural practices (slash and burn farming, known as tavy).

The forests around Tolagnaro (Fort-Dauphin) have also come under threat as a result of mining for titanium-rich sands. Vincelette et al (2003) state that this is of particular concern because the unique habitat here is known to contain rare genera and species endemic to this region of Madagascar alone.

Sainte Luce Reserve is a member of The Lemur Conservation Network, an organisation which works to save Madagascar's lemurs from extinction.

== Conservation ==
The idyllic location and abundant wildlife makes the reserve one of the key places to volunteer in Madagascar. The reserve is a small non profit organisation, and relies on volunteers to help accomplish important conservation projects. Volunteers assist with lemur research, sea turtle monitoring, seed collecting, tree planting and community outreach.
