= Chrysalidocarpus oropedionis =

Conservation status
- Critically Endangered (IUCN 3.1)

Scientific classification
- Kingdom: Plantae
- Clade: Tracheophytes
- Clade: Angiosperms
- Clade: Monocots
- Clade: Commelinids
- Order: Arecales
- Family: Arecaceae
- Genus: Chrysalidocarpus
- Species: C. oropedionis

Binomial name
- Chrysalidocarpus oropedionis (Beentje) Eiserhardt & W.J.Baker

Synonyms
- Dypsis oropedionis Beentje

Species of palm

Chrysalidocarpus oropedionis is a species of flowering plant in the family Arecaceae. It a palm native to central Madagascar. It is threatened by habitat loss.
