= Chrysalidocarpus tsaratananensis =

Conservation status
- Data Deficient (IUCN 3.1)

Scientific classification
- Kingdom: Plantae
- Clade: Embryophytes
- Clade: Tracheophytes
- Clade: Angiosperms
- Clade: Monocots
- Clade: Commelinids
- Order: Arecales
- Family: Arecaceae
- Genus: Chrysalidocarpus
- Species: C. tsaratananensis

Binomial name
- Chrysalidocarpus tsaratananensis (Jum.) Eiserhardt & W.J.Baker

Synonyms
- Dypsis tsaratananensis (Jum.) Beentje & J.Dransf.; Neodypsis tsaratananensis Jum.

Species of flowering plant

Chrysalidocarpus tsaratananensis is a species of flowering plant in the family Arecaceae. It is a palm found only in Madagascar. It is native to the Tsaratanana Massif of northern Madagascar, where it grows in montane moist forest and montane moist shrubland on steep slopes from 1,400 to 1,900 metres (4,600 to 6,200 ft) elevation.
