= Chrysalidocarpus serpentinus =

Conservation status
- Vulnerable (IUCN 3.1)

Scientific classification
- Kingdom: Plantae
- Clade: Embryophytes
- Clade: Tracheophytes
- Clade: Angiosperms
- Clade: Monocots
- Clade: Commelinids
- Order: Arecales
- Family: Arecaceae
- Genus: Chrysalidocarpus
- Species: C. serpentinus

Binomial name
- Chrysalidocarpus serpentinus (Beentje) Eiserhardt & W.J.Baker

Synonyms
- Dypsis serpentina Beentje

Species of flowering plant

Chrysalidocarpus serpentinus is a species of flowering plant in the family Arecaceae. It is a palm endemic to northeastern Madagascar.
