= Chrysalidocarpus piluliferus =

Conservation status
- Vulnerable (IUCN 3.1)

Scientific classification
- Kingdom: Plantae
- Clade: Embryophytes
- Clade: Tracheophytes
- Clade: Angiosperms
- Clade: Monocots
- Clade: Commelinids
- Order: Arecales
- Family: Arecaceae
- Genus: Chrysalidocarpus
- Species: C. piluliferus

Binomial name
- Chrysalidocarpus piluliferus Becc.

Synonyms
- Dypsis pilulifera (Becc.) Beentje & J.Dransf.

Species of flowering plant

Chrysalidocarpus piluliferus is a species of flowering plant in the family Arecaceae. It is a palm endemic to northern and east-central Madagascar. It grows in lowland and montane rain forest from 300 to 1,300 metres (980 to 4,270 ft) elevation. It is threatened by habitat loss.
