= Chrysalidocarpus lanceolatus =

Conservation status
- Vulnerable (IUCN 2.3)

Scientific classification
- Kingdom: Plantae
- Clade: Embryophytes
- Clade: Tracheophytes
- Clade: Angiosperms
- Clade: Monocots
- Clade: Commelinids
- Order: Arecales
- Family: Arecaceae
- Genus: Chrysalidocarpus
- Species: C. lanceolatus

Binomial name
- Chrysalidocarpus lanceolatus Becc.

Synonyms
- Dypsis lanceolata (Becc.) Beentje & J.Dransf.

Species of flowering plant

Chrysalidocarpus lanceolatus is a species of flowering plant in the family Arecaceae. It is a palm found only in the Comoro Islands.
