= Chrysalidocarpus andrianatonga =

Conservation status
- Vulnerable (IUCN 3.1)

Scientific classification
- Kingdom: Plantae
- Clade: Embryophytes
- Clade: Tracheophytes
- Clade: Angiosperms
- Clade: Monocots
- Clade: Commelinids
- Order: Arecales
- Family: Arecaceae
- Genus: Chrysalidocarpus
- Species: C. andrianatonga

Binomial name
- Chrysalidocarpus andrianatonga (Beentje) Eiserhardt & W.J.Baker

Synonyms
- Dypsis andrianatonga Beentje

Species of flowering plant

Chrysalidocarpus andrianatonga is a species of flowering plant in the family Arecaceae. It is a palm found only in Madagascar. It is threatened by habitat loss.

It is native to the mountains of northern Madagascar, ranging from Manongarivo to Marojejy. It grows in moist lowland and montane forest and montane heath from 400 to 1,400 metres (1,300 to 4,600 ft) elevation, typically on rocky sites with abundant mosses and lichens.
