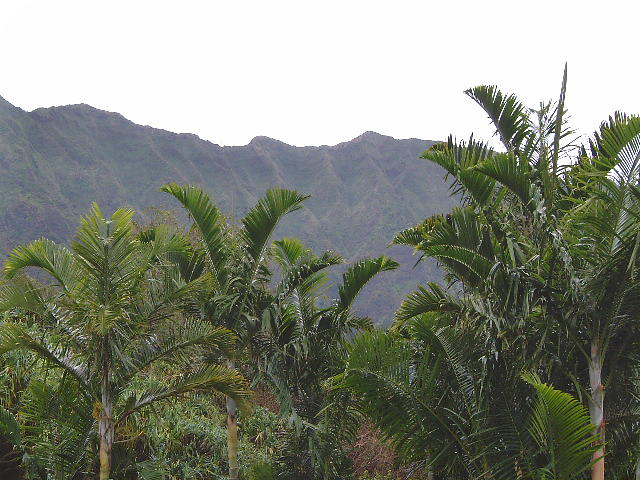

Conservation status
- Vulnerable (IUCN 3.1)

Scientific classification
- Kingdom: Plantae
- Clade: Embryophytes
- Clade: Tracheophytes
- Clade: Angiosperms
- Clade: Monocots
- Clade: Commelinids
- Order: Arecales
- Family: Arecaceae
- Genus: Chrysalidocarpus
- Species: C. pembanus

Binomial name
- Chrysalidocarpus pembanus H.E.Moore

Synonyms
- Dypsis pembana (H.E.Moore) Beentje & J.Dransf.

= Chrysalidocarpus pembanus =

Species of flowering plant

Chrysalidocarpus pembanus, also known as mpapindi or mpopo wa mwitu, is a species of plant in the family Arecaceae that is endemic to Pemba Island in Tanzania.

This is the sole Chrysalidocarpus species native outside Madagascar and the Comoro Islands.

== Distribution and habitat ==
C. pembanus is known only from two locations on Pemba Island, Tanzania, where it grows in moist evergreen lowland and littoral forests up to 50 m (160 ft) above sea level.

== Description ==
C. pembanus is a clustering palm growing 4–12 m (13–39 ft) tall. The stems are pale brown to green in colour and prominently ringed with leaf scars, measuring 6–15 cm (2.4–5.9 in) in diameter with internodes up to 24 cm (9.4 in) long. The arching, waxy green leaves are composed of a rachis up to 1 m (3 ft 3 in) long with 40-50 leaflets on either side. The branched inflorescence is borne on a peduncle measuring approximately 60 cm (24 in) long which may lengthen by up to 40% when fruiting. The dark red fruit measure 12–15 mm (0.47–0.59 in) by 5–7 mm (0.20–0.28 in).

== Conservation status ==
C. pembanus is listed as vulnerable by the International Union for the Conservation of Nature under criterion D2, based on its restricted area of occupancy and small population. It may be threatened by the expansion of tourist infrastructure on Pemba, however, the main subpopulation is located within a protected area, Ngezi Forest Reserve.
