= Andohahela National Park =

National park in Madagascar

- IUCN category II (national park)
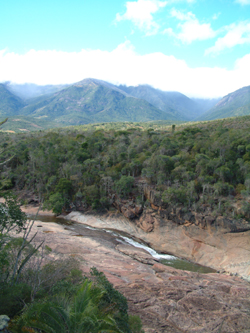

- Location within Madagascar
- Location: Anosy, Madagascar
- Nearest city: Tôlanaro (Fort Dauphin)
- Coordinates: 24°36′3″S 46°41′58″E
- Area: 760 km^{2}
- Established: 1939 (protected area); 1998 (national park)
- Visitors: approx. 1300 (in 2005)
- Governing body: Madagascar National Parks Association

The Andohahela National Park is situated in Anosy in the south-east of Madagascar. It is remarkable for the extremes of habitats that are represented within it. The park covers 760 km^{2} (293 sq mi) of the Anosy mountain range, the southernmost spur of the Malagasy Highlands and contains the last humid rainforests in the southern part of Madagascar.

The park was inscribed in the World Heritage Site in 2007 as part of the Rainforests of the Atsinanana.

== Access ==
The Andohahela National Park is accessible via the unpaved Provincial road, RIP118, which originates in Soanierana. Travelers should be prepared for a rough road, as it is not paved.

== History ==
Andohahela has been a protected area since 1939, but did not become a national park until 1998.

== Geography ==
Andohahela National Park is 40 kilometres (25 mi) north-west of Fort-Dauphin and at the southern end of the Malagasy Highlands. The park is divided into three zones. The first, Malio, ranges from 100 metres (330 ft) to the summit of Pic d' Andohahela at 1,956 metres (6,417 ft), and has dense lowland and montane rainforest with more than two hundred species of tree ferns, orchids, wild vanilla, lemurs and many birds. The second, Ihazofotsy-Mangatsiaka, contains dry spiny forest with rare birds and reptiles in altitudes ranging from 100 metres (330 ft) to 1,005 metres (3,297 ft) at the summit of Pic de Vohidagoro.

The third zone, Tsimelahy, is mainly at an altitude of 125 metres (410 ft) and contains the unique Ranopiso transitional forest. The mountains form a natural barrier to the moist trade winds that blow from the east, causing on the eastern side a rainfall of 1,500–2,000 millimetres (59–79 in) per year that supports one of the few rainforests south of the Tropic of Capricorn. At the western edge of the park, the rainfall is just 600–700 millimetres (24–28 in) per year and the resulting vegetation is a dry spiny forest characteristic of southern Madagascar.

Several circuits within each of the habitat types of the park can be accessed by road from the town of Fort-Dauphin.

== Flora and fauna ==
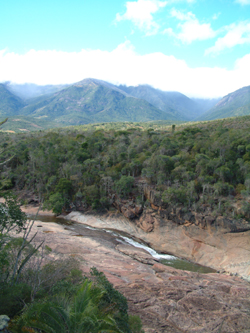
A view over the transitional forest of Andohahela National Park,

The variety of habitats within Andohahela is mirrored in the richness of species that are found there, and the park is the richest place in Madagascar for lemurs. Fifteen species have been recorded, including two of Madagascar's most emblematic species, the ring-tailed lemur and Verreaux's sifaka. Some rare species of geckos, turtles and snakes are among the 67 species of reptiles found in the park, 130 species of birds and fifty species of amphibians. The Triangle palm is found only here.

List of lemur species found in Andohahela National Park
| Location | Habitat Type | Species |
|---|---|---|
| Malio (Parcel 1) | Rain forest | Day viewing: Collared brown lemur (Eulemur collaris); Southern lesser bamboo lemur (Hapalemur meridionalis); Milne-Edwards's sifaka (Propithecus edwardsi) – not confirmed; Night viewing: Fleurete's sportive lemur (Lepilemur fleuretae); unidentified species of mouse lemur (Microcebus) – not confirmed; unidentified species of fork-marked lemur (Phaner) – not confirmed; Aye-aye (Daubentonia madagascariensis) – not confirmed |
| Ihazofotsy (Parcel 2) | Spiny forest | Day viewing: Ring-tailed lemur (Lemur catta); Verreaux's sifaka (Propithecus verreauxi); Night viewing: Southern Woolly Lemur; (Avahi meridionalis): Gray mouse lemur (Microcebus murinus); Reddish-gray mouse lemur (Microcebus griseorufus); White-footed sportive lemur (Lepilemur leucopus); Fat-tailed dwarf lemur (Cheirogaleus medius) |
| Tsimelahy (Parcel 3) | Transitional forest | few lemurs (not documented) |

== See also ==
- Mandena (nearby mine)
- Sainte Luce Reserve
- Lavasoa-Ambatotsirongorongo Mountains
