= Chrysalidocarpus prestonianus =

Conservation status
- Vulnerable (IUCN 3.1)

Scientific classification
- Kingdom: Plantae
- Clade: Embryophytes
- Clade: Tracheophytes
- Clade: Angiosperms
- Clade: Monocots
- Clade: Commelinids
- Order: Arecales
- Family: Arecaceae
- Genus: Chrysalidocarpus
- Species: C. prestonianus

Binomial name
- Chrysalidocarpus prestonianus (Beentje) Eiserhardt & W.J.Baker

Synonyms
- Dypsis prestoniana Beentje

Species of flowering plant

Chrysalidocarpus prestonianus is a species of flowering plant in the family Arecaceae. It is a palm native to central-eastern and southeastern Madagascar. It is threatened by habitat loss.
