= Chrysalidocarpus malcomberi =

Conservation status
- Endangered (IUCN 3.1)

Scientific classification
- Kingdom: Plantae
- Clade: Embryophytes
- Clade: Tracheophytes
- Clade: Angiosperms
- Clade: Monocots
- Clade: Commelinids
- Order: Arecales
- Family: Arecaceae
- Genus: Chrysalidocarpus
- Species: C. malcomberi

Binomial name
- Chrysalidocarpus malcomberi (Beentje) Eiserhardt & W.J.Baker

Synonyms
- Dypsis malcomberi Beentje

Species of flowering plant

Chrysalidocarpus malcomberi is a species of flowering plant in the family Arecaceae. It is a palm native to southeastern Madagascar. It is threatened by habitat loss.
