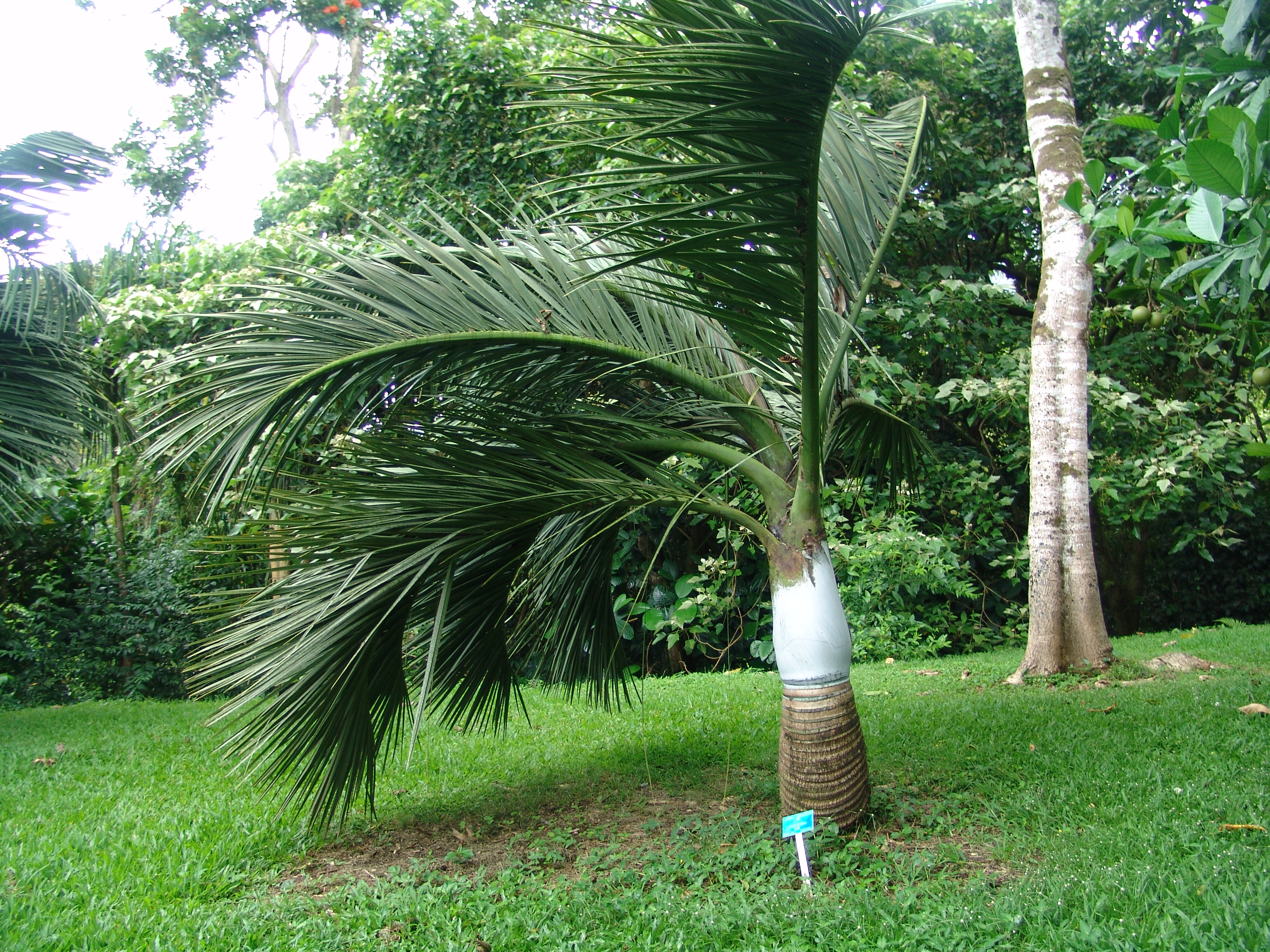

Conservation status
- Vulnerable (IUCN 3.1)
- CITES Appendix I

Scientific classification
- Kingdom: Plantae
- Clade: Tracheophytes
- Clade: Angiosperms
- Clade: Monocots
- Clade: Commelinids
- Order: Arecales
- Family: Arecaceae
- Genus: Chrysalidocarpus
- Species: C. decipiens

Binomial name
- Chrysalidocarpus decipiens Becc.

Synonyms
- Dypsis decipiens (Becc.) Beentje & J.Dransf. Macrophloga decipiens (Becc.) Becc.

= Chrysalidocarpus decipiens =

Species of plant in the palm family

Chrysalidocarpus decipiens, synonym Dypsis decipiens or the Manambe palm, is a species of flowering plant in the palm family (Arecaceae). It is found only in the central highlands of Madagascar, between Fianarantsoa and Andilamena at 1,200 to 1,700 meters elevation. The species is threatened by habitat loss, increasing frequency of fires, and over-exploitation of its seeds for the horticultural trade. It may produce twin trunks like the letter "V", each trunk being up to 20 metres (66 ft) height and up to 70 cm (28 in) diameter at breast height. There can also be three trunks, or a single trunk.
