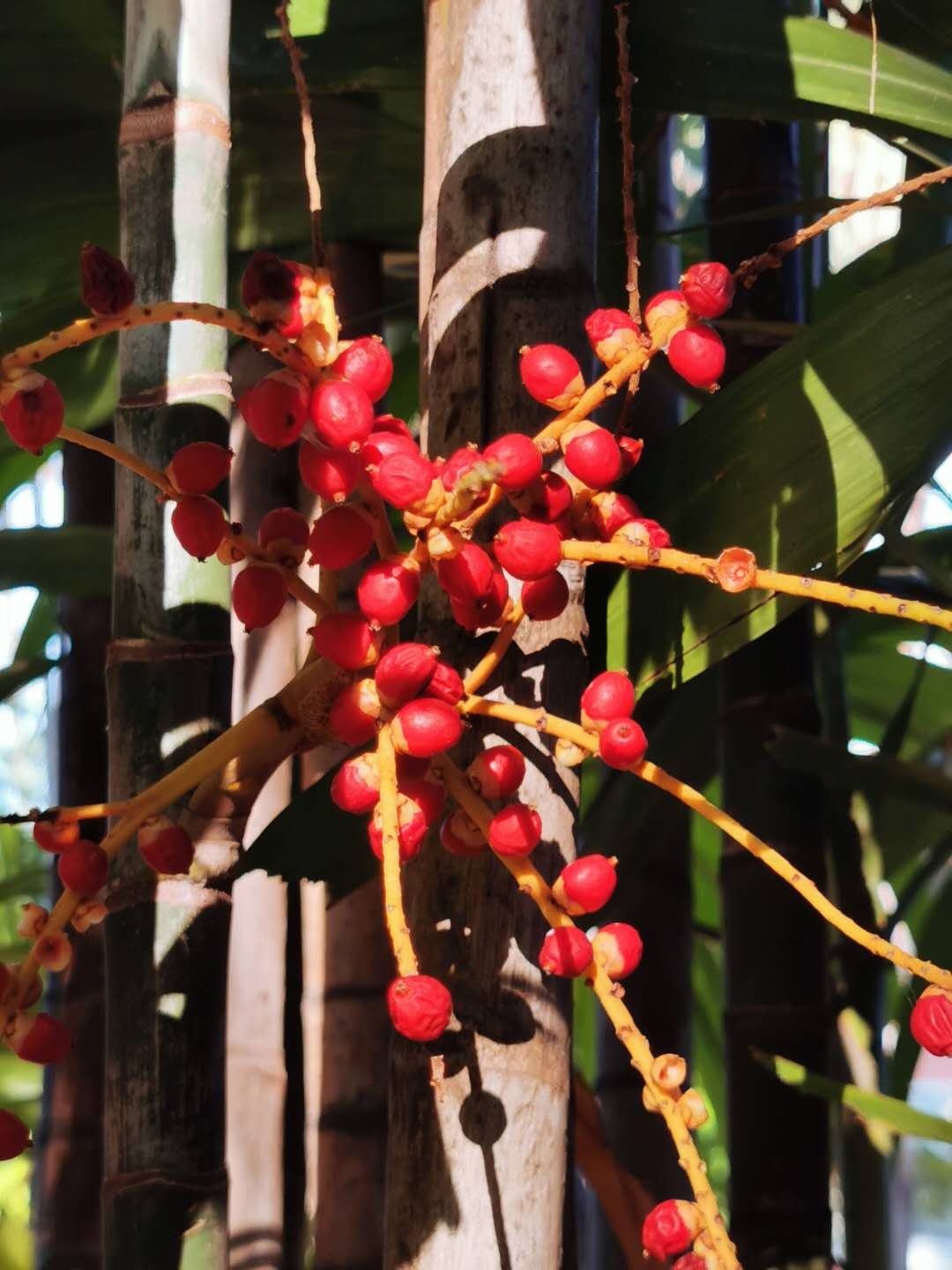
- Fruit of Chrysalidocarpus lutescens

Scientific classification
- Kingdom: Plantae
- Clade: Tracheophytes
- Clade: Angiosperms
- Clade: Monocots
- Clade: Commelinids
- Order: Arecales
- Family: Arecaceae
- Subfamily: Arecoideae
- Tribe: Areceae
- Genus: Chrysalidocarpus; H.Wendl.

Synonyms
- Macrophloga Becc. (1914); Neodypsis Baill. (1894); Phlogella Baill. (1894)

= Chrysalidocarpus =

Genus of plants

Chrysalidocarpus is a valid genus of African palms, family Arecaceae, first described by Hermann Wendland in 1878. The native range of species in this genus includes the Comoros, Madagascar and Pemba Islands, but some have been naturalised elsewhere as ornamental plants. Most species were previously placed in the genus Dypsis, including the type species Chrysalidocarpus lutescens.

== Species ==
As of May 2026, Plants of the World Online accepts 62 species:

- Chrysalidocarpus acuminum Jum.
- Chrysalidocarpus albofarinosus (Hodel & Marcus) Eiserhardt & W.J.Baker
- Chrysalidocarpus ambanjae (Beentje) Eiserhardt & W.J.Baker
- Chrysalidocarpus ambositrae (Beentje) Eiserhardt & W.J.Baker
- Chrysalidocarpus andersenii Hodel
- Chrysalidocarpus andrianatonga (Beentje) Eiserhardt & W.J.Baker
- Chrysalidocarpus ankaizinensis Jum.
- Chrysalidocarpus ankirindro (W.J.Baker, Rakotoarin. & M.S.Trudgen) Eiserhardt & W.J.Baker
- Chrysalidocarpus arenarum Jum.
- Chrysalidocarpus baronii Becc.
- Chrysalidocarpus basilongus (Jum. & H.Perrier) Eiserhardt & W.J.Baker
- Chrysalidocarpus bejofo (Beentje) Eiserhardt & W.J.Baker
- Chrysalidocarpus blackii Hodel
- Chrysalidocarpus burtscherorum (Hodel) Hodel
- Chrysalidocarpus cabadae H.E.Moore
- Chrysalidocarpus canaliculatus (Jum.) Eiserhardt & W.J.Baker
- Chrysalidocarpus canescens Jum. & H.Perrier
- Chrysalidocarpus carlsmithii (J.Dransf. & Marcus) Eiserhardt & W.J.Baker
- Chrysalidocarpus ceraceus (Jum.) Eiserhardt & W.J.Baker
- Chrysalidocarpus decaryi (Jum.) Eiserhardt & W.J.Baker
- Chrysalidocarpus decipiens Becc.
- Chrysalidocarpus gracilis (Jum.) Eiserhardt & W.J.Baker
- Chrysalidocarpus hamannii Hodel
- Chrysalidocarpus hankona J.Dransf., Marcus & W.J.Baker
- Chrysalidocarpus heteromorphus (Jum.) Eiserhardt & W.J.Baker
- Chrysalidocarpus hovomantsina (Beentje) Eiserhardt & W.J.Baker
- Chrysalidocarpus humblotianus (Baill.) Becc.
- Chrysalidocarpus ifanadianae (Beentje) Eiserhardt & W.J.Baker
- Chrysalidocarpus × lafazamanga Hodel & Burtscher
- Chrysalidocarpus lanceolatus Becc.
- Chrysalidocarpus lastellianus (Baill.) Eiserhardt & W.J.Baker
- Chrysalidocarpus leptocheilos (Hodel) Eiserhardt & W.J.Baker
- Chrysalidocarpus leucomallus (J.Dransf. & Marcus) Eiserhardt & W.J.Baker
- Chrysalidocarpus ligulatus (Jum.) Eiserhardt & W.J.Baker
- Chrysalidocarpus loucoubensis (Jum.) Eiserhardt & W.J.Baker
- Chrysalidocarpus lutescens H.Wendl.
- Chrysalidocarpus madagascariensis (D.T.Fish) Becc.
- Chrysalidocarpus malcomberi (Beentje) Eiserhardt & W.J.Baker
- Chrysalidocarpus mananjarensis Jum. & H.Perrier
- Chrysalidocarpus mijoroanus (Eiserhardt & W.J.Baker) Eiserhardt & W.J.Baker
- Chrysalidocarpus nauseosus (Jum. & H.Perrier) Eiserhardt & W.J.Baker
- Chrysalidocarpus onilahensis Jum. & H.Perrier
- Chrysalidocarpus oropedionis (Beentje) Eiserhardt & W.J.Baker
- Chrysalidocarpus ovobontsira (Beentje) Eiserhardt & W.J.Baker
- Chrysalidocarpus ovojavavy (Eiserhardt & W.J.Baker) Eiserhardt & W.J.Baker
- Chrysalidocarpus paucifolius Jum.
- Chrysalidocarpus pembanus H.E.Moore
- Chrysalidocarpus piluliferus Becc.
- Chrysalidocarpus plumosus (Hodel, Marcus & J.Dransf.) Eiserhardt & W.J.Baker
- Chrysalidocarpus prestonianus (Beentje) Eiserhardt & W.J.Baker
- Chrysalidocarpus psammophilus (Beentje) Eiserhardt & W.J.Baker
- Chrysalidocarpus pumilus (Beentje) Eiserhardt & W.J.Baker
- Chrysalidocarpus rabepierrei (Eiserhardt & W.J.Baker) Eiserhardt & W.J.Baker
- Chrysalidocarpus robustus (Hodel, Marcus & J.Dransf.) Eiserhardt & W.J.Baker
- Chrysalidocarpus rufescens J.Dransf., Eiserhardt & Marcus
- Chrysalidocarpus saintelucei (Beentje) Eiserhardt & W.J.Baker
- Chrysalidocarpus sanctaemariae (J.Dransf.) Eiserhardt & W.J.Baker
- Chrysalidocarpus serpentinus (Beentje) Eiserhardt & W.J.Baker
- Chrysalidocarpus tanalensis (Jum. & H.Perrier) Eiserhardt & W.J.Baker
- Chrysalidocarpus titan J.Dransf., Marcus & W.J.Baker
- Chrysalidocarpus tokoravina (Beentje) Eiserhardt & W.J.Baker
- Chrysalidocarpus tsaratananensis (Jum.) Eiserhardt & W.J.Baker
- Chrysalidocarpus tsaravoasira (Beentje) Eiserhardt & W.J.Baker
