= Chrysalidocarpus ankirindro =

Conservation status
- Near Threatened (IUCN 3.1)

Scientific classification
- Kingdom: Plantae
- Clade: Tracheophytes
- Clade: Angiosperms
- Clade: Monocots
- Clade: Commelinids
- Order: Arecales
- Family: Arecaceae
- Genus: Chrysalidocarpus
- Species: C. ankirindro

Binomial name
- Chrysalidocarpus ankirindro (W.J.Baker, Rakotoarin. & M.S.Trudgen) Eiserhardt & W.J.Baker

Synonyms
- Dypsis ankirindro W.J.Baker, Rakotoarin. & M.S.Trudgen

Species of palm

Chrysalidocarpus ankirindro is a species of flowering plant in the family Arecaceae. It is a palm endemic to Madagascar. It known from the Makira Natural Park in northeastern Madagascar, where it grows in moist montane elfin forest, mountain thickets, and on ridge tops on quartzite-derived soils from 650 to 950 metres elevation.

The species was named Dypsis ankirindro by William John Baker, Mijoro Rakotoarinivo, and Melinda S. Trudgen in 2009. In 2022 Baker and Wolf L. Eiserhardt placed the species in genus Chrysalidocarpus as C. ankirindro.
