= Henri Lucien Jumelle =

French botanist

Henri Lucien Jumelle (French pronunciation: [ɑ̃ʁi lysjɛ̃ ʒymɛl]; 25 November 1866 in Dreux, Eure-et-Loir Department, France – 6 December 1935 in Marseille, Bouches-du-Rhône Department, France) was a French botanist.

== Life and career ==
From 1887 to 1894, he worked as a plant physiologist at the Faculté des Sciences in Paris. Afterwards, he was a professor of botany at the Faculté des Sciences in Marseille (1894-1935). From 1898 to 1916, he was assistant director, then director of the Musée colonial et du Jardin botanique in Marseille.

He held a deep interest in applied botany, publishing numerous treatises on the agricultural aspects of various plants. During his career, he worked closely with botanist Joseph Alfred Perrier de la Bâthie, who sent him botanical material from Madagascar. As a taxonomist, he circumscribed many new species native to Madagascar.

From 1922 to 1935, he was a correspondent-member of the Académie des Sciences (botanical section).

== Botanical eponymy ==
- Jumellea (family Orchidaceae), named by Rudolf Schlechter, 1914.
- Jumelleanthus (family Malvaceae), named by Bénédict Pierre Georges Hochreutiner, 1924.

== Selected works ==
- Recherches physiologiques sur le développement des plantes annuelles, 1889.
- Le laboratoire de biologie végétale de Fontainebleau dirigé par Gaston Bonnier, 1890.
- Les cultures coloniales (8 volumes), 1901–1927.
- Les ressources agricoles et forestières des colonies françaises, 1907.
- Les plantes à tubercules alimentaires des climats tempérés et des pays chauds, 1910.
- Catalogue descriptif des collections botaniques du Musée colonial de Marseille : Madagascar et la Réunion, 1916.
