= Madagascar lowland forests =

Ecoregion in Eastern Madagascar

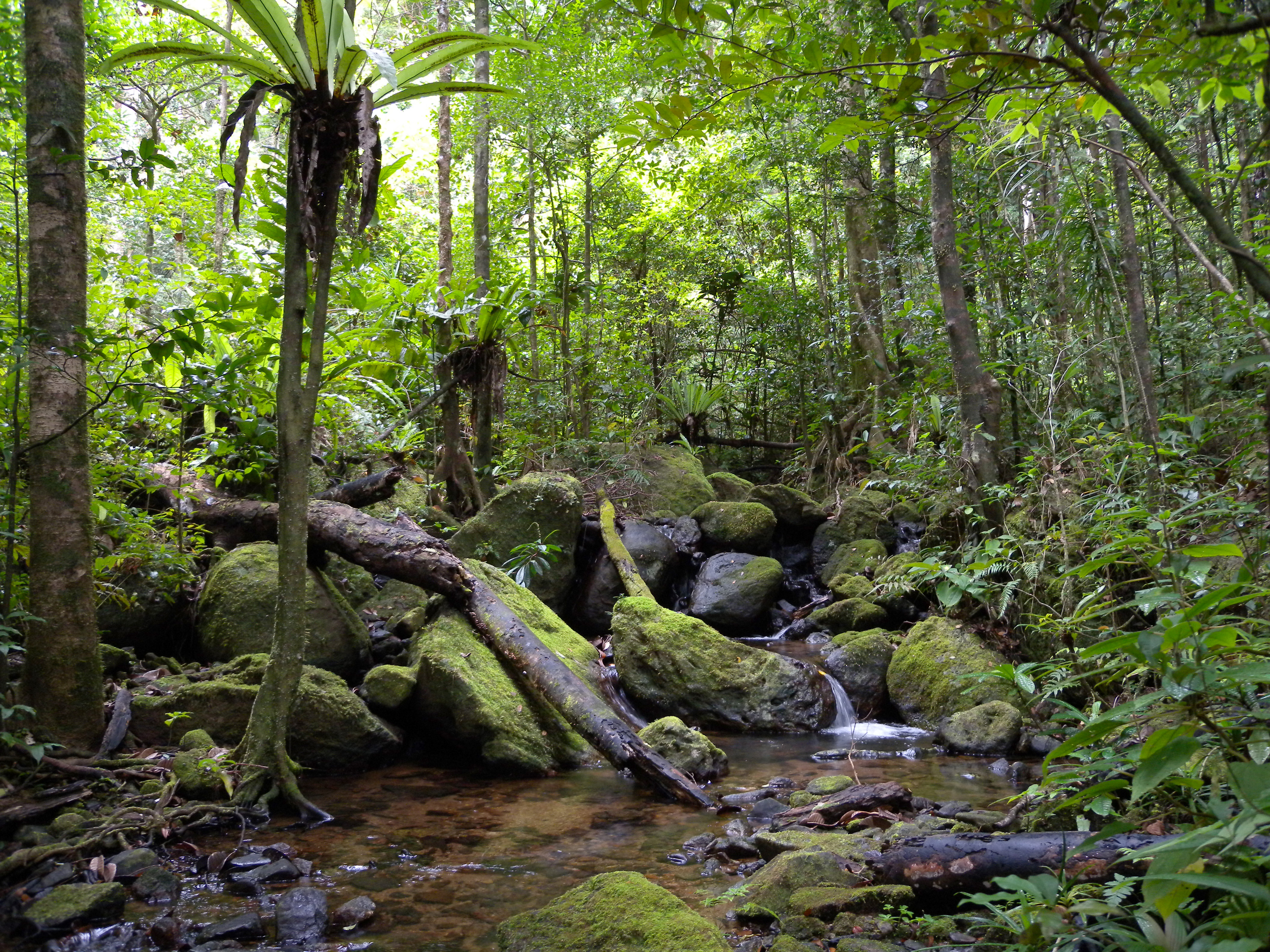
- Humid forest in Masoala National Park

Ecology
- Realm: Afrotropical
- Biome: Tropical and subtropical moist broadleaf forests
- Borders: Madagascar subhumid forests, Madagascar spiny forests
- Animals: Lemurs, chameleons, Mantella frogs

Geography
- Area: 112,100 km^{2} (43,300 mi^{2})
- Country: Madagascar
- Elevation: 0–800 metres (0–2,625 ft)
- Coordinates: 19°48′S 48°30′E
- Geology: Metamorphic and igneous basement rock; locally lava and unconsolidated sands
- Climate type: Tropical rainforest climate (Af) and Tropical monsoon climate (Am)

Conservation
- Conservation status: critical/endangered
- Global 200: included
- Protected: 10.79%

The Madagascar lowland forests or Madagascar humid forests are a tropical moist broadleaf forest ecoregion found on the eastern coast of the island of Madagascar, home to a plant and animal mix that is 80 to 90% endemic, with the forests of the eastern plain being a particularly important location of this endemism. They are included in the Global 200 list of outstanding ecoregions.

== Geography ==
The ecoregion constitutes a narrow strip of lowland forests between Madagascar's east coast and the mountainous Central Highlands, from sea level to 800 metres (2,600 ft) elevation. It covers an area of approximately 112,600 square kilometres (43,500 sq mi). The ecoregion is under the direct influence of the oceanic trade winds, which maintain a warm, humid climate; rainfall is above 2,000 mm per year and can reach up to 6,000 mm on the Masoala peninsula.

The lowland forests extend from Marojejy in the north to the southeast corner of the island. At the northern edge of ecoregion around Vohemar, the moist forests transition to the drier Madagascar dry deciduous forests ecoregion. To the east, at approximately 800 metres (2,600 ft) elevation, the lowland forests transition gradually to the Madagascar subhumid forests ecoregion. The southern end of the ecoregion lies at the crest of the Anosyennes Mountains, where a narrow belt of dry transitional forest marks the transition to the dry spiny forests ecoregion in the mountains' rain shadow.

== Flora ==
The lowland forests are characterized by dense evergreen forests, 82% of which is endemic species, with a canopy exceeding 30 metres (98 ft). Typical canopy species include Dalbergia, Diospyros, Ocotea, Symphonia, and Tambourissa; emergents of Canarium, Albizia, and Brochoneura acuminata rise above the canopy. The lowland forests have a rich diversity of Pandanus, palm, bamboo, and epiphytic orchid species. At higher elevations the trees become shorter and have a denser undergrowth.

== Fauna ==
The lowland forests represent a great reservoir of diversity and endemism. Nearly all of Madagascar's endemic mammal genera are represented there, including all five families of lemurs.

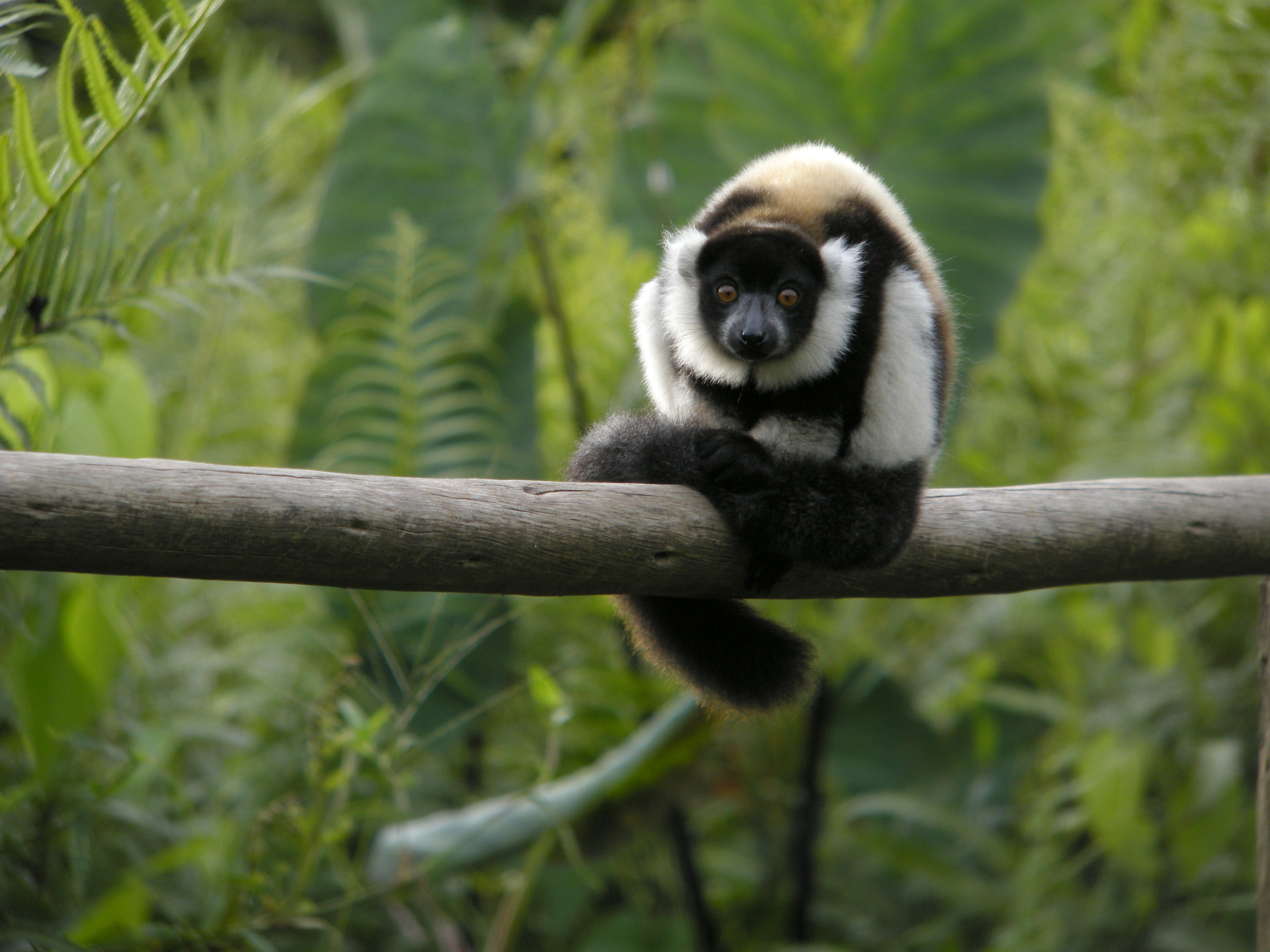
Black-and-white ruffed lemur (Varecia variegata)

Fifteen species and subspecies of lemurs are endemic and near-endemic to the ecoregion, including the aye-aye (Daubentonia madagascariensis), the hairy-eared dwarf lemur (Allocebus trichotis), both species of ruffed lemurs (Varecia variegata, V. rubra), the indri (Indri indri), the eastern woolly lemur (Avahi laniger), the diademed sifaka (Propithecus diadema), Milne-Edwards's sifaka (P. edwardsi), the golden bamboo lemur (Hapalemur aureus), the greater bamboo lemur (Prolemur simus), the gray-headed lemur (Eulemur cinereiceps), the collared brown lemur (E. collaris), and the red-bellied lemur (E. rubriventer).

As well as lemurs, the forest are home to seven endemic genera of rodents, six endemic genera of carnivorans and several species of bat. Rare animals include the brown-tailed mongoose (Salanoia concolor).

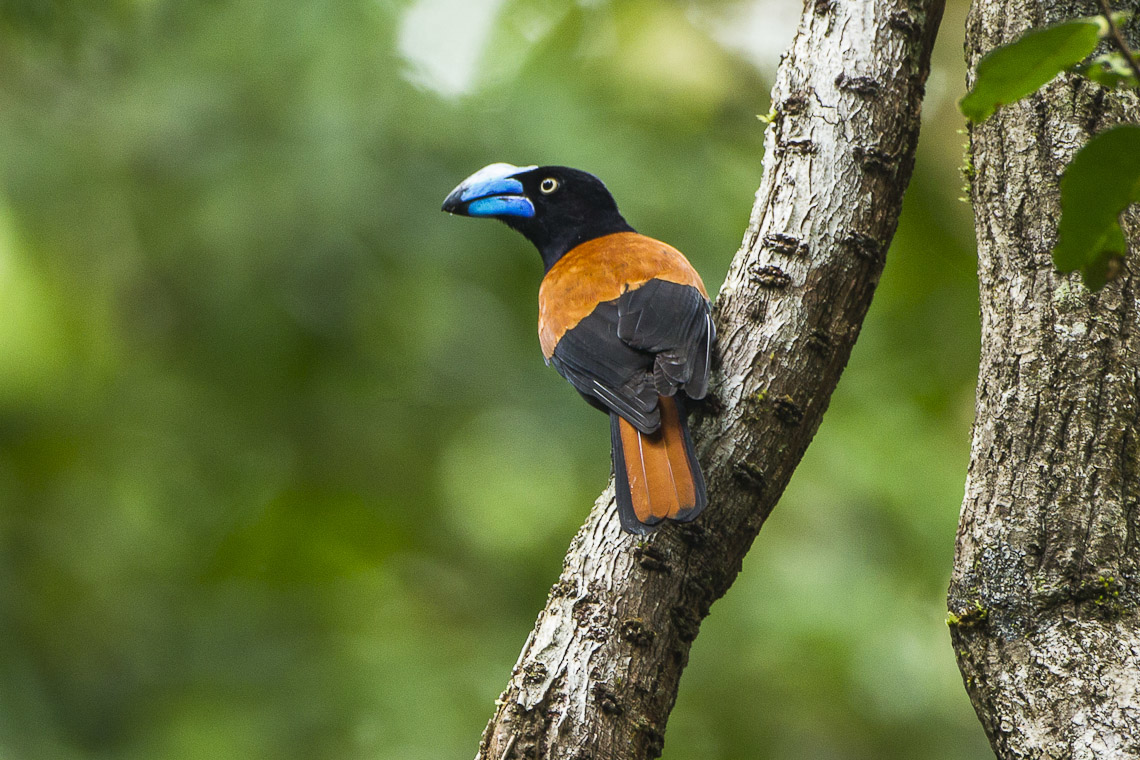
Helmet vanga (Euryceros prevostii)

The lowland forests are home to many of endemic and limited-range species of birds. Of the 165 bird species found here 42 are endemic to the region, such as the rare red-tailed newtonia (Newtonia fanovanae). The brown mesite (Mesitornis unicolor), red-breasted coua (Coua serriana), scaly ground roller (Geobiastes squamiger), nuthatch vanga (Hypositta corallirostris), helmet vanga (Euryceros prevostii), Bernier's vanga (Oriolia bernieri), red-tailed newtonia (Newtonia fanovanae), and dusky tetraka (Xanthomixis tenebrosa) are largely endemic to the lowland forests, ranging occasionally into the lower montane forests. The Madagascar serpent eagle (Eutriorchis astur), short-legged ground roller (Brachypteracias leptosomus), Madagascar red owl (Tyto soumagnei), Pollen's vanga (Xenopirostris polleni), and brown emu-tail (Bradypterus brunneus) live in both the lowland forests and montane forests. The rufous vanga (Schetba rufa) and Madagascar green pigeon (Treron australis) are widespread Madagascar lowland birds who inhabit the humid lowland forests as well as the dry forests on the west of the island.

A famous extinct species is Delalande's coua (Coua delalandei) which has not been seen since the 19th century.

The forests are also home to 50 endemic reptiles and 29 amphibians such as the following chameleons: Calumma gallus, Calumma cucullatum, Furcifer balteatus, Furcifer bifidus, Brookesia superciliaris, and Brookesia therezieni. The freshwater fish population, with more than 100 endemic species, is also unique.

== Threats and preservation ==
Madagascar's lowland rainforests have been preserved generally better than the high central plateau, but there has still been substantial loss. Widespread slash-and-burn activity in the lowland rainforests is one of the major reasons. Slash-and-burn is a method sometimes used by shifting cultivators to create short term yields from marginal soils. When practiced repeatedly, or without intervening fallow periods, the nutrient-poor soils may be exhausted or eroded to an unproductive state. Another threat is the selective exploitation of some species, such as palms and tree ferns.

10.79% of the ecoregion is in protected areas, including national parks and reserves. They include:

- Ambato Atsinanana
- Analamazaotra National Park
- Andasibe-Mantadia National Park
- Andohahela National Park
- Kalambatritra Reserve
- Manombo Special Reserve
- Marojejy National Park
- Ranomafana National Park
- Mangerivola Special Reserve
- Masoala National Park
- Tsitongambarika
- Zahamena National Park

== Gallery ==
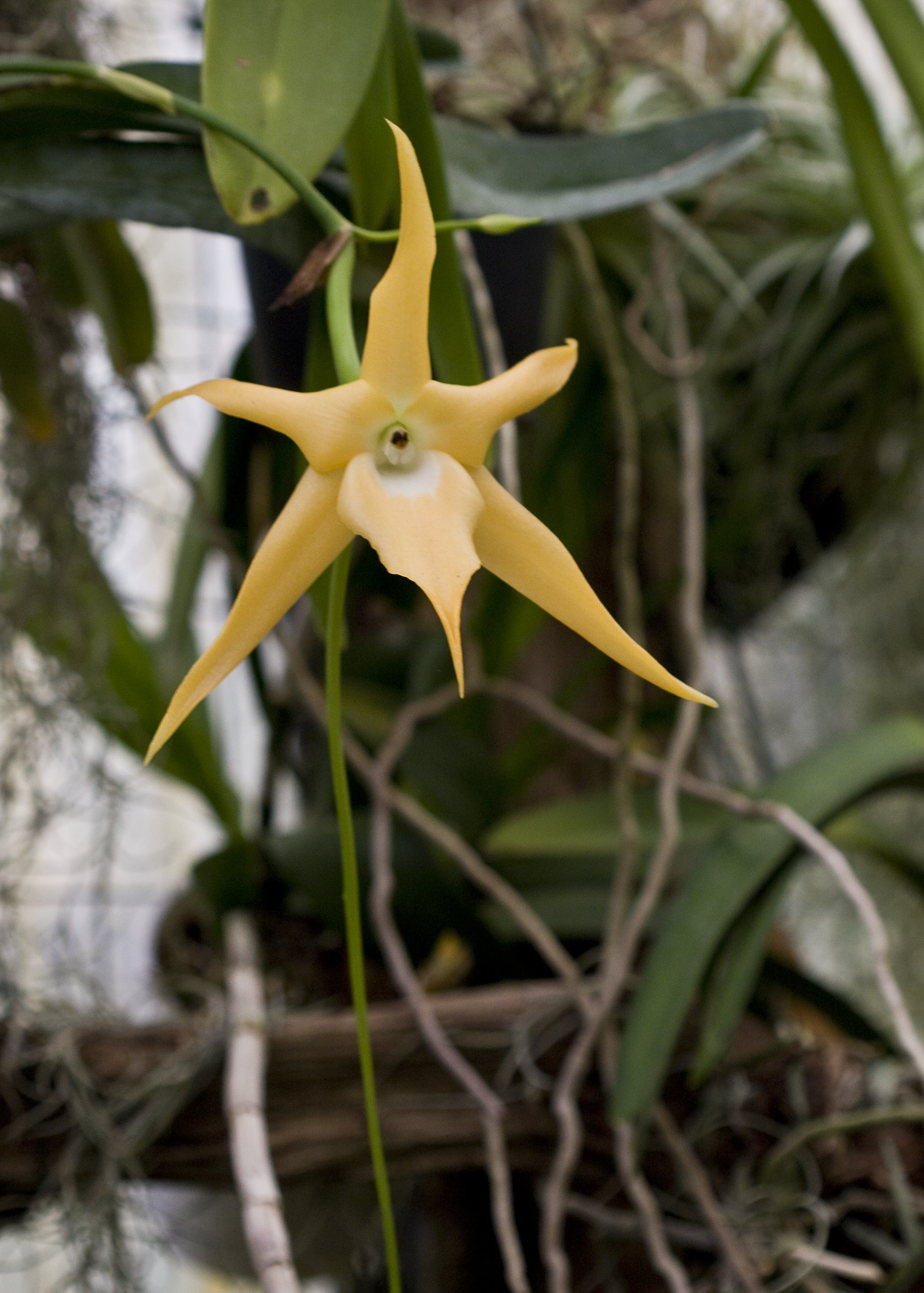
Angraecum sesquipedale, one of over 900 orchids in Madagascar

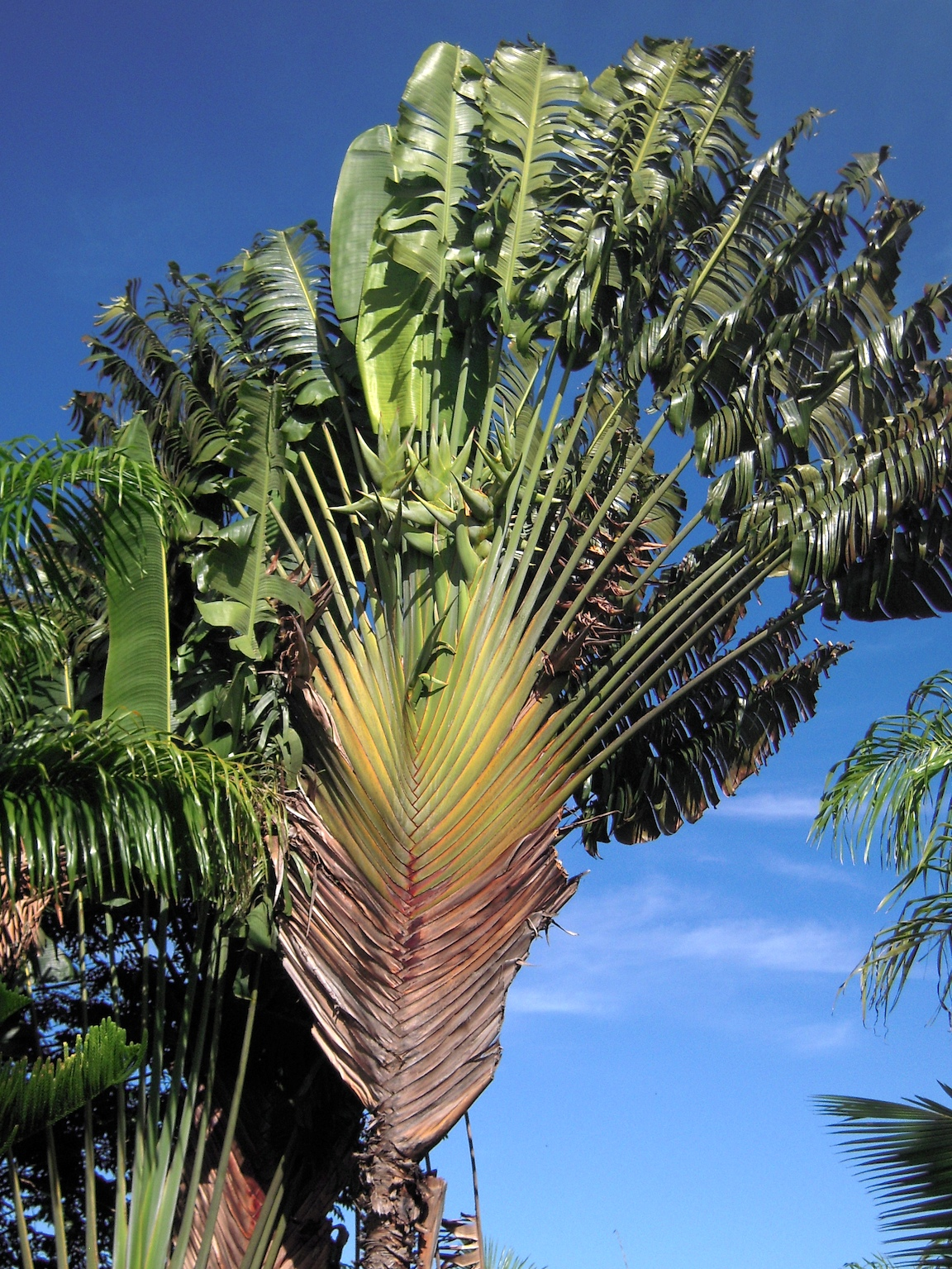
Traveler's tree (Ravenala madagascariensis), Madagascar's national emblem

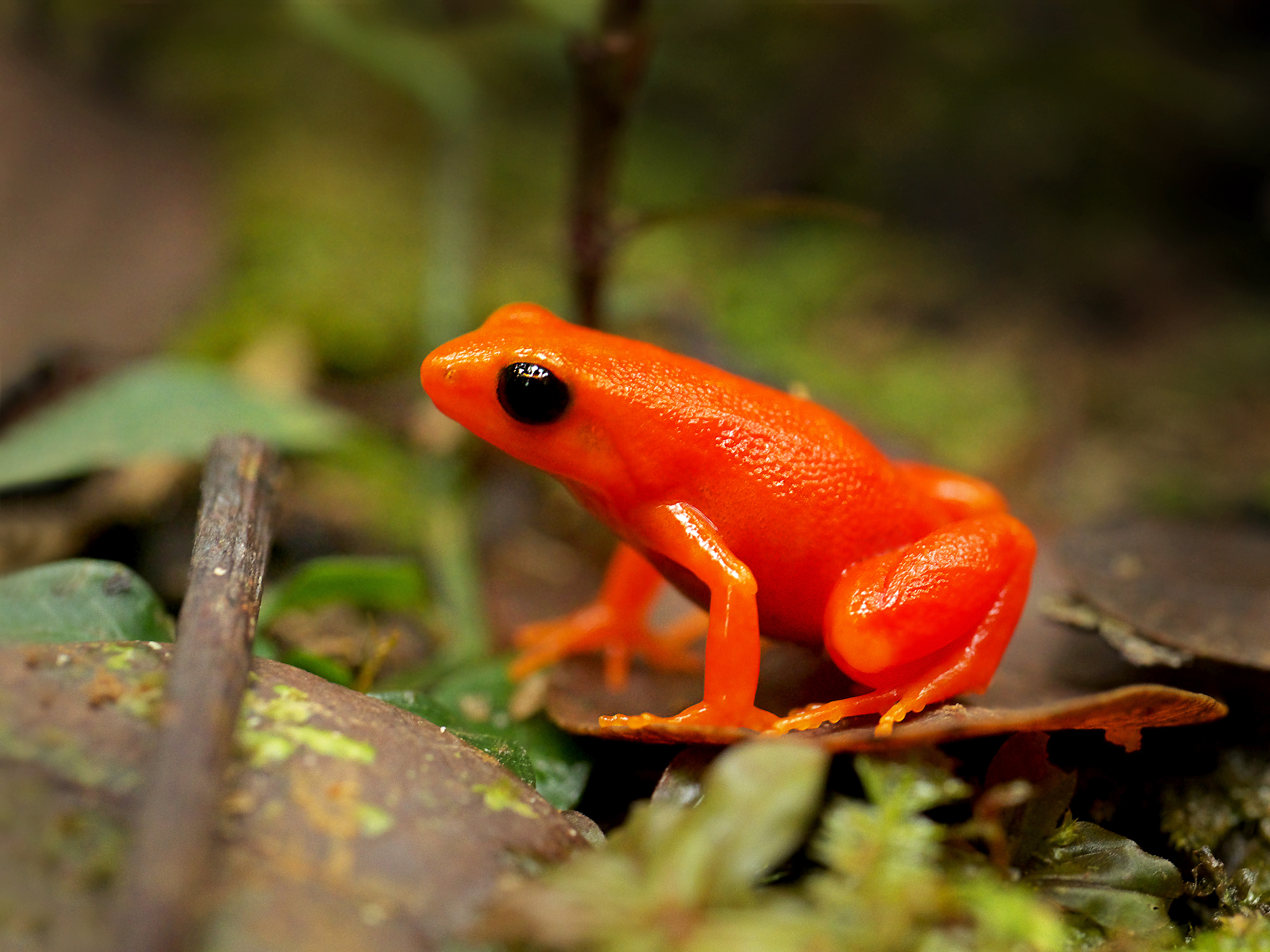
Golden mantella (Mantella aurantiaca), an endangered frog endemic to the eastern rainforests.

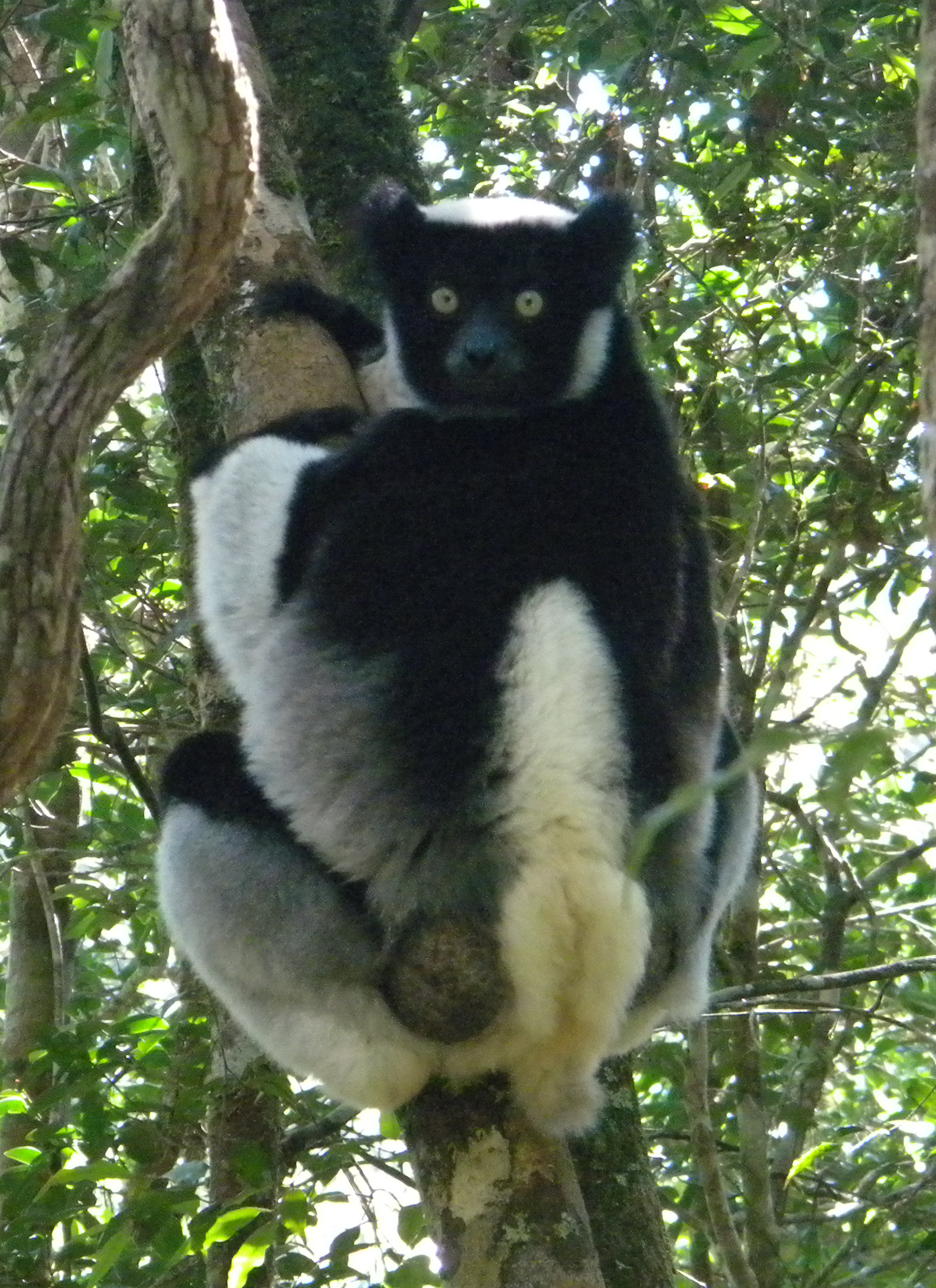
Indri (Indri indri), the largest living lemur

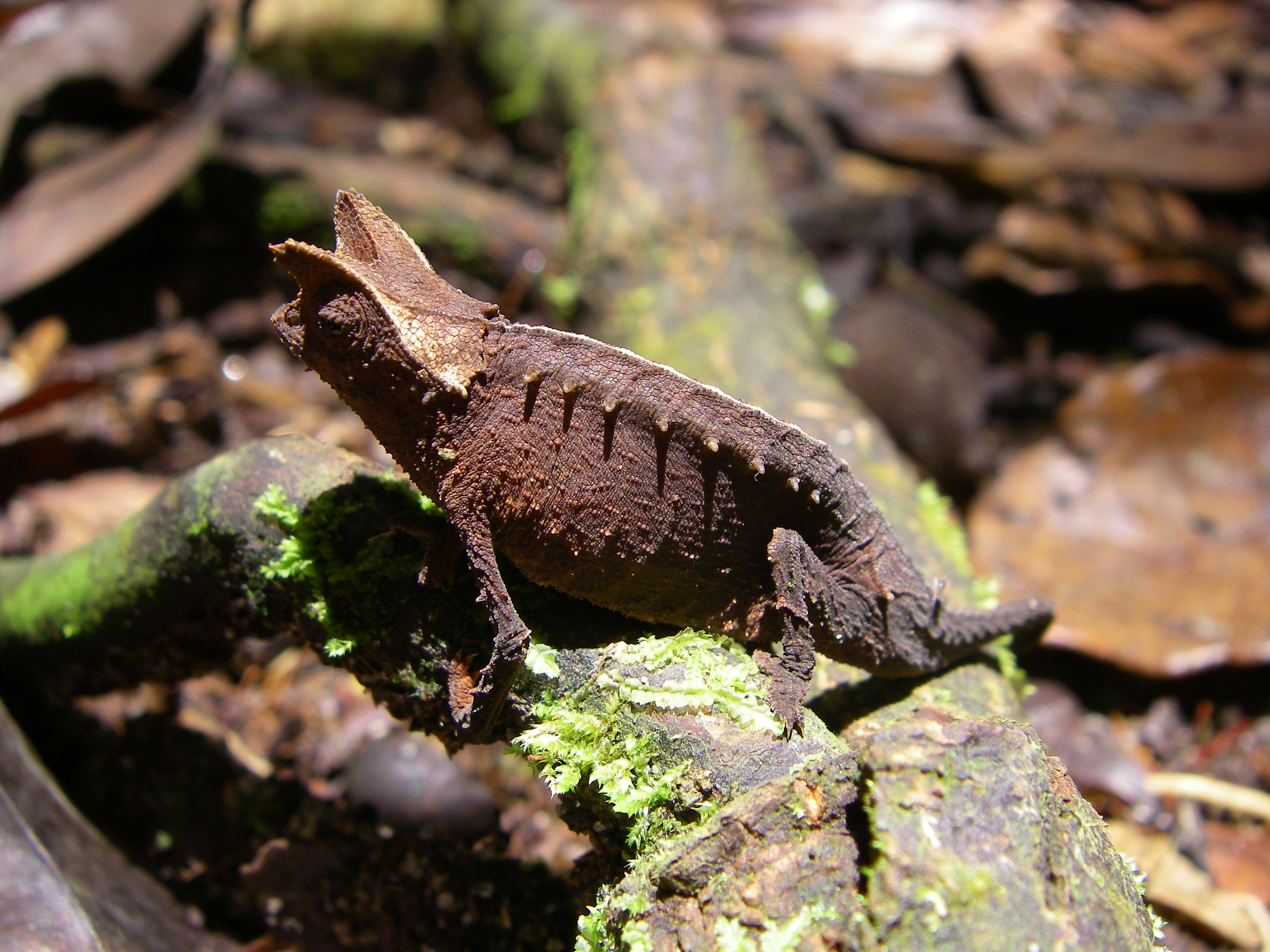
Brown leaf chameleon (Brookesia superciliaris)

== See also ==
- Ecoregions of Madagascar
