= Henk Jaap Beentje =

Dutch botanist (born 1951)

- Born: 1951 (age 74–75); Bakkum, Netherlands
- Known for: Research on African Asteraceae and Arecaceae
- Awards: Fellow of the Linnean Society of London
- Scientific career
- Fields: Botany
- Institutions: National Museums of Kenya; Royal Botanic Gardens, Kew
- Thesis: A monograph on Strophanthus DC. (Apocynaceae) (1982)

Henk Jaap Beentje (born 1951, Bakkum) is a Dutch botanist.

== Biography ==
=== Education ===
In 1978 he obtained a masters in biology at the University of Amsterdam. He obtained his PhD at the Wageningen Agricultural University on the thesis A monograph on Strophanthus DC. (Apocynaceae), prepared under the direction of Hendrik de Wit and A.J.M. Leeuwenberg, in 1982.

=== Career ===
Since 1975, Beentje has been active in Africa. Between 1984 and 1989, he was a research fellow at the East African Herbarium, a herbarium that is part of the National Museums of Kenya in Kenya.

Since 1995, Beentje has been a researcher at the herbarium of the Royal Botanic Gardens, Kew. He is particularly engaged in research of mainly African species from the Composite and the Palm families. In the area of the palms, he has often collaborated with John Dransfield. Beentje also serves as an editor of the publication series Flora of Tropical East Africa. He is a Fellow of the Linnean Society of London.

== Selected publications ==
- A Field Guide to the Acacias of Kenya, Malcolm Coe, Henk Beentje & Rosemary Wise, Oxford University Press (1992), ISBN 0-19-858411-3
- Kenya Trees, Shrubs, and Lianas, Henk Beentje, Joy Adamson & Dhan Bhanderi, National Museums of Kenya (1994), ISBN 9966-9861-0-3
- The Palms of Madagascar, John Dransfield, Henk Beentje, Margaret Tebbs & Rosemary Wise, Royal Botanic Gardens, Kew (1995), ISBN 0-947643-82-6
- Field Guide to the Palms of Madagascar, John Dransfield, Henk Beentje, Adam Britt, Tianjanahary Ranarivelo & Jeremie Razafitsalama, Kew Publishing (2006), ISBN 1-84246-157-5
