= Cyclone Herold =

2020 Southwest Indian Ocean cyclone

Intense Tropical Cyclone Herold
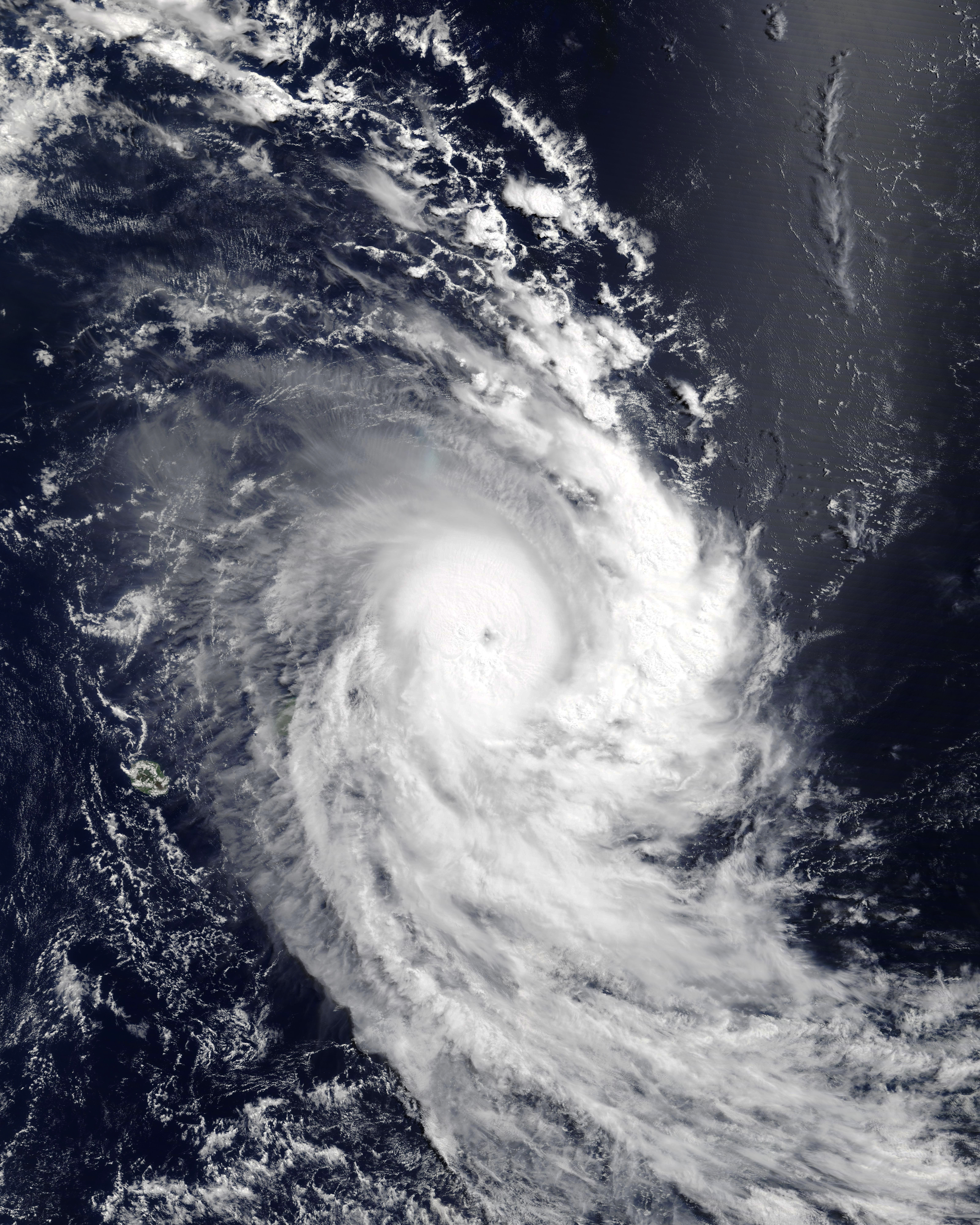
- Herold at peak intensity on 17 March

Meteorological history
- Formed: 13 March 2020
- Remnant low: 19 March 2020
- Dissipated: 21 March 2020

Intense tropical cyclone
- 10-minute sustained (MF)
- Highest winds: 165 km/h (105 mph)
- Highest gusts: 230 km/h (145 mph)
- Lowest pressure: 955 hPa (mbar); 28.20 inHg

Category 3-equivalent tropical cyclone
- 1-minute sustained (SSHWS/JTWC)
- Highest winds: 185 km/h (115 mph)
- Lowest pressure: 960 hPa (mbar); 28.35 inHg

Overall effects
- Fatalities: 5 total
- Damage: Unknown
- Areas affected: Madagascar, Tromelin Island, Mauritius, Rodrigues
- IBTrACS /
- Part of the 2019–20 South-West Indian Ocean cyclone season

Intense Tropical Cyclone Herold was a powerful tropical cyclone that affected Madagascar and the Mascarene Islands in March 2020. Herold was the tenth zone of disturbed weather, ninth depression, eighth moderate tropical storm, sixth severe tropical storm, fifth tropical cyclone, and second intense tropical cyclone of the slightly above-average 2019–20 South-West Indian Ocean cyclone season. Herold formed on 13 March from a disorganized area of low pressure near Tromelin Island.

When Herold reached Madagascar, it caused five deaths and an unknown amount of damage. Thousands of homes were flooded in the northeastern region. Maroantsetra got the worst of Herold, with all five deaths it caused coming from there.

== Meteorological history ==
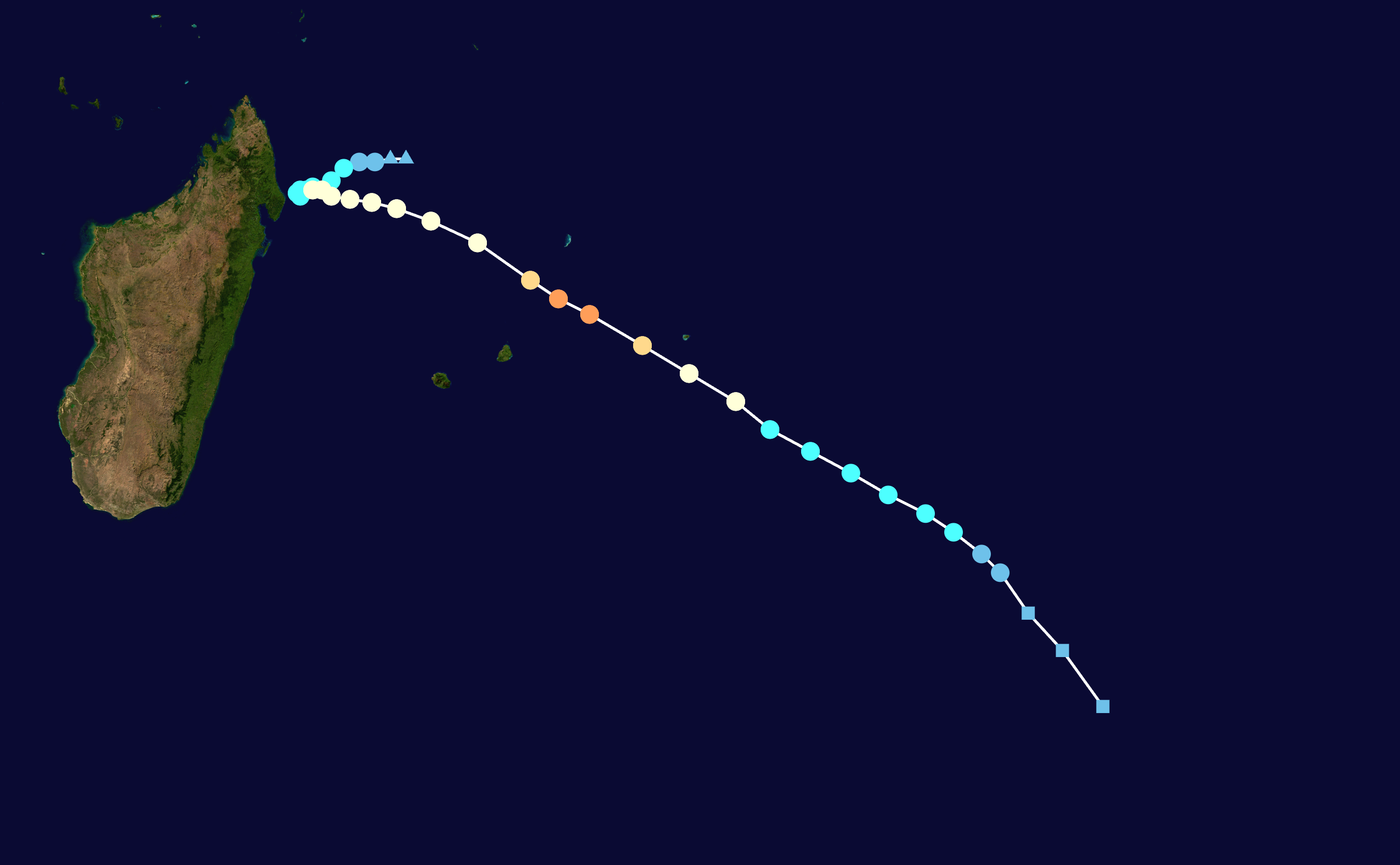
Map plotting the intensity and track of the storm, according to the Saffir–Simpson scale

Early in March 2020, an area of low pressure existed near Tromelin Island, but it dissipated on 4 March. It unexpectedly regenerated the next day near the Mascarene Islands. Météo France predicted it would strengthen into a tropical depression by the end of the week. Over the next two weeks, it gradually gained convection, until on 13 March, Zone of Disturbed Weather 10 formed northwest of Madagascar. The next day, the JTWC and MFR upgraded it to a tropical depression. Late on 14 March, 10 reached moderate tropical storm intensity and was named Herold. The JTWC began tracking it as Tropical Cyclone 22S. Herold began to undergo slow intensification. At 18:00 UTC on 15 March, the cyclone was designated Tropical Cyclone Herold. Late on March 17, Herold reached its peak intensity as an Intense tropical cyclone, and the JTWC classified it as a Category 3-equivalent tropical cyclone. As this happened, Herold rapidly moved southeast, Herold's peak intensity was short-lived. On 18 March, Herold began rapidly weakening. Later that day, Herold became extratropical. Finally, on 20 March, Herold dissipated entirely.

== Preparations ==
=== Madagascar ===
The first alert, a green alert (issued two to five days before the storm's potential impact), was issued on March 13 by Météo Madagascar for the areas in northeastern Madagascar. The next day, the alert was upgraded to a yellow alert (issued one to two days before storm, storm is going to be damaging area but it has not truly happened yet).

=== Mascarene Islands ===
On 18 March, a class four cyclone warning was issued for Rodrigues.

== Impact ==
=== Madagascar ===
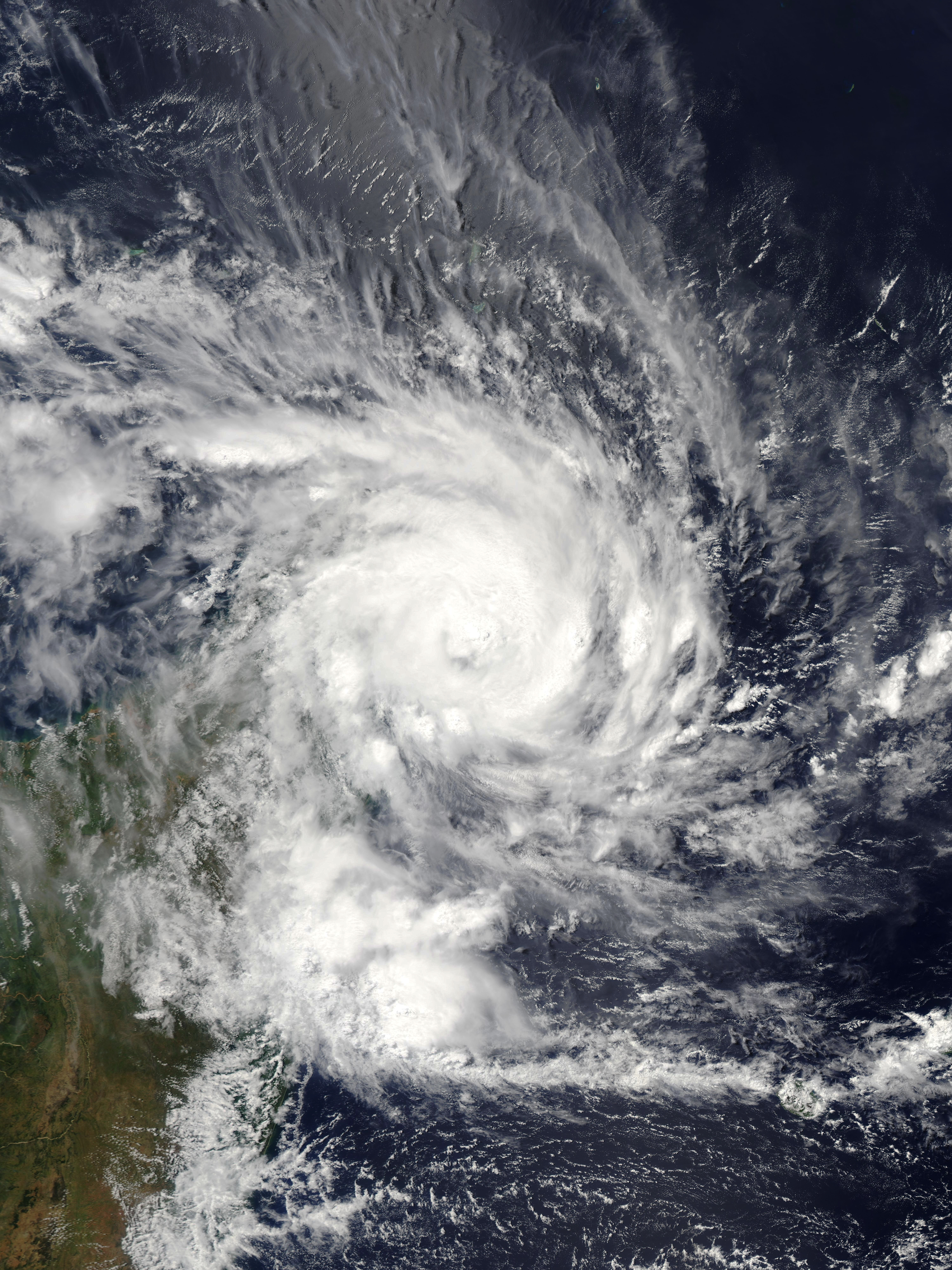
Herold stalling near the coast of Madagascar on 14 March

Heavy rain was recorded in northeastern Madagascar on 13 March. 95 mm (3.7 in) fell on Sambava that same day. Intense flooding occurred in the Ankavanana River, which threatened more than 1000 people. Five people were killed in the Sava Region. Flooding impacted more than 100 schools. Homes were swept away in areas near Maroantsetra. Near the Andranofotsy River, people were most affected. By 17 March, though, the water level had decreased a fair amount in the community. That day, the water level on land rose to 2 meters (6.6 feet). 13 of 20 municipalities in the Maroantsetra district were underwater and 28 houses had been destroyed in the town of Mahalevona. In Maroantsetra, 104 homes were affected by the storm surge. A school in Anjanazana was found with puddles of mud in its classrooms. The effects of Herold didn't end until the cyclone alerts were lifted on 17 March for the entire island. 911 homes were flooded. 178 huts were damaged, and 127 residencies were destroyed in Madagascar. In Maroantsetra, 79 classrooms were damaged, and 24 were damaged in Sainte-Marie.

=== Mascarene Islands ===
In the Mascarene Islands, maximum sustained winds of 185 km/h (115 mph) was recorded. When Herold passed in between the islands of Mauritius and Rodrigues on 17 March, it made schools close and caused eighty people to seek refuge in accommodation centers. In the islands, damage was minimal. In most areas, it was limited to downed trees and power outages. However, a gust of 130 km/h (81 mph) was recorded in Sir Gaëtan Duval Airport. Maximum rainfall was no more than 29 mm (1.1 in). Herold also briefly passed over Réunion. There was no known damage there.

== See also ==
- Weather of 2020
- Tropical cyclones in 2020
- Cyclone Belna, a storm of similar intensity that also affected Madagascar
- 2019–20 South-West Indian Ocean cyclone season
- List of South-West Indian Ocean intense tropical cyclones
