= 2019–20 South-West Indian Ocean cyclone season =

Cyclone season in the Southwest Indian Ocean

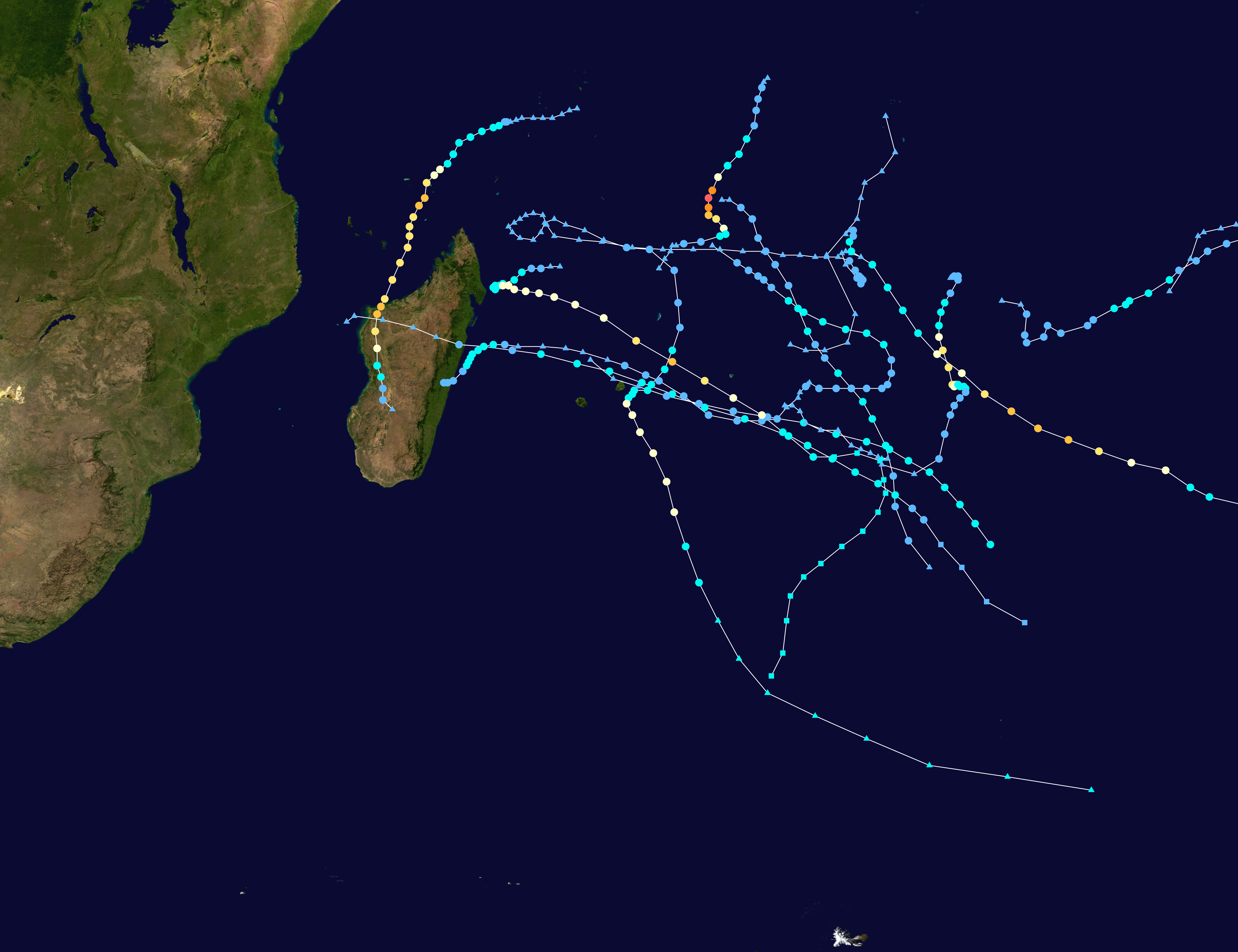
- Season summary map

Seasonal boundaries
- First system formed: 22 July 2019
- Last system dissipated: 16 April 2020

Strongest storm
- Name: Ambali
  - Maximum winds: 220 km/h (140 mph) (10-minute sustained)
  - Lowest pressure: 930 hPa (mbar)

Seasonal statistics
- Total disturbances: 12
- Total depressions: 11
- Total storms: 10
- Tropical cyclones: 6
- Intense tropical cyclones: 4
- Very intense tropical cyclones: 1
- Total fatalities: 46 total
- Total damage: > $25 million (2020 USD)

Related articles
- 2019–20 Australian region cyclone season; 2019–20 South Pacific cyclone season

The 2019–20 South-West Indian Ocean cyclone season was a slightly above-average season in tropical cyclone and subtropical cyclone formation west of 90°E. The season officially began on 15 November, however, the formation of the first system—Zone of Disturbed Weather 01—occurred on 22 July 2019, well before the official start of the season. This was the earliest start to a season since the 2016–17 season. The season then officially ended on 30 April 2020, with the exception of Mauritius and the Seychelles, for which it officially ended on 15 May 2020. These dates conventionally delimit the period of each year when most tropical and subtropical cyclones form in the basin, which is west of 90°E and south of the Equator. Tropical and subtropical cyclones in this basin are monitored by the Regional Specialized Meteorological Centre in Réunion.

For the second consecutive year in a row, the first system formed before the official start of the season. Afterwards, three storms formed in the month of December: Tropical Cyclone Belna on 2 December, which brought flooding and strong wind to northwestern Madagascar, Very Intense Tropical Cyclone Ambali, which formed a day later and became the first very intense tropical cyclone in the basin since Fantala in 2016, and Tropical Cyclone Calvinia which stalled near Mauritius and brought heavy rain and moderate flooding to the island nation towards the end of the month, crossing into 2020. The rest of the year would remain quite weak until Intense Tropical Cyclone Herold formed in March, becoming the first major cyclone of 2020. Just weeks after, Intense Tropical Cyclone Irondro in April would become the third intense tropical cyclone of the season. The season would later conclude with the dissipation of Moderate Tropical Storm Jeruto on 16 April. The season had little impact on land with the fact that all storms that formed with the exception of Belna, Diane and Francisco did not make any direct impacts on land and stayed out to sea.

== Seasonal forecasts ==
The season began with one of the strongest positive phases of the Indian Ocean Dipole (IOD) in the past 40 years. Météo-France Réunion expected that the positive anomalies would decay slowly throughout austral summer, having a prominent impact on the cyclone season through mid-February. As a result, storm activity was not forecast to begin until December—the month in which the monsoonal flow becomes established in the western half of the basin (the dry conditions in the central and eastern Indian Ocean induced by the IOD would prevent typical early-season storms). With warm and wet conditions expected in the western Indian Ocean, cyclone formation was expected to be enhanced west of 70°E.

A near-average eight to eleven storms were expected throughout the course of the season, with the possibility of a higher than average number of these attaining Tropical Cyclone strength with winds of 120 km/h (75 mph) or greater as a result of favorable upper-level divergence in the western region of the basin. Activity was expected to be focused west of the Chagos Archipelago, presenting an increased threat to land. A wide range of track types and motions were expected, although predominantly southerly storm motion were expected to be favored.

In November, the Mauritius Meteorological Services forecasted eight to ten named storms and emphasized that storm formation would be more likely west of Diego Garcia.

== Seasonal summary ==
On 22 July, Zone of Disturbed Weather 01 formed and started the cyclone season. The disturbance failed to organise into a tropical depression and dissipated on 25 July.

Tropical activity came to a halt until 2 December when Tropical Disturbance 02 formed. A day later, Tropical Depression 03 formed and was later named Ambali. On 5 December, Tropical Storm Ambali rapidly intensified, becoming the first very intense tropical cyclone since Fantala in 2016. Tropical Disturbance 02 then became Belna, and Belna continued to intensify into a Severe Tropical Storm. Belna then intensified into a cyclone, equivalent to a category 3 hurricane before making landfall in northwestern Madagascar as a category 2 hurricane-equivalent storm, leaving significant damages and 9 deaths. In late December, tropical storm Calvinia formed. It persisted into 2020. Activity was quiet for three weeks. On 19 January, a tropical depression formed, but soon dissipated without being named.

Two tropical storms formed in late January, Diane and Esami. They also both dissipated without reaching tropical cyclone status. In early February, another tropical depression formed. It eventually intensified into a tropical storm and was named Francisco. Francisco degenerated into a remnant low several days after formation. In mid-February, the storm regenerated into a tropical depression. At the same time, another disturbance formed, and would strengthen into Tropical Storm Gabekile. It wasn't long until Gabekile strengthened into a tropical cyclone. However, it quickly weakened. By 19 February, Gabekile had dissipated. Nearly a month later, Moderate Tropical Storm Herold formed. On 14 March, Herold strengthened into a severe tropical storm. Herold then rapidly intensified to become the season's 2nd Intense Tropical Cyclone. Shortly after, it rapidly weakened as it moved southwards before dissipating. In early April, Moderate tropical storm Irondro formed. Irondro was also an intense tropical cyclone, but it dissipated some time later, on 6 April. A tropical low crossed over on 12 April, and was named Jeruto. However, Jeruto rapidly entered unfavorable conditions, and quickly dissipated on 16 April.

== Systems ==
=== Zone of Disturbed Weather 01 ===
- Zone of disturbed weather (MFR)
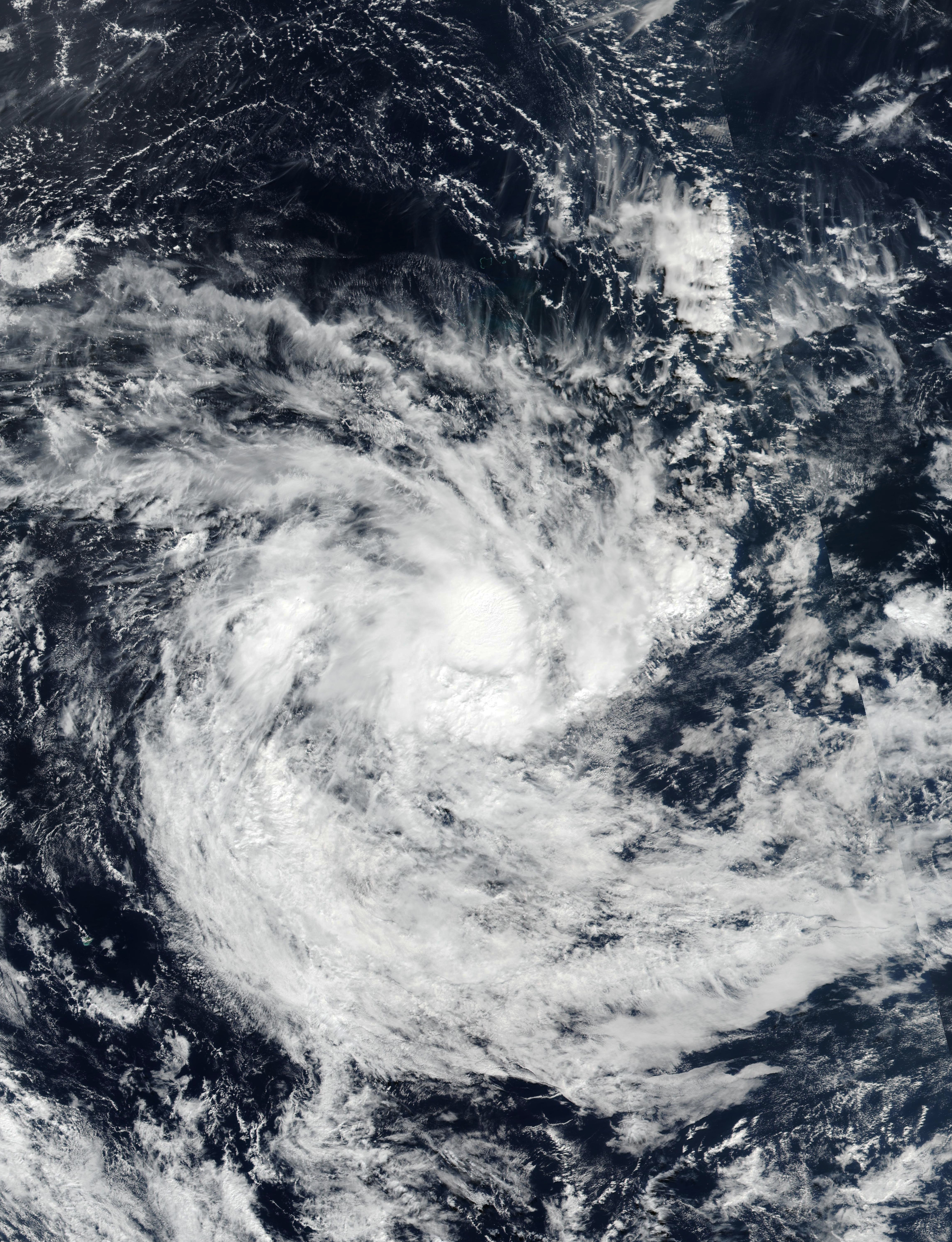
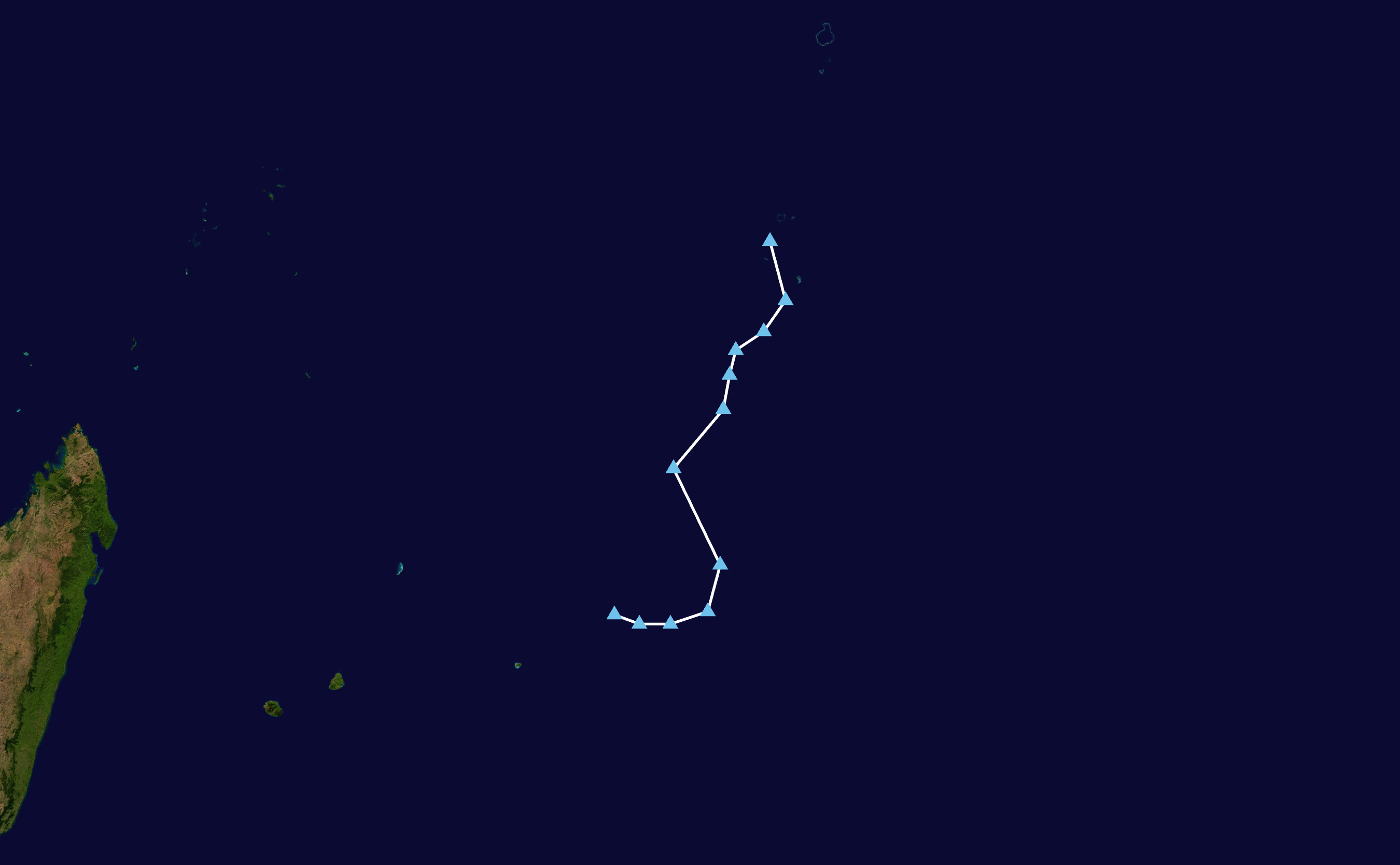
- Duration: 22 July – 25 July
- Peak intensity: 45 km/h (30 mph) (10-min); 1001 hPa (mbar)

In mid-July, a broad wind circulation developed over the central Indian Ocean, accompanied by deep convection. Some computer models suggested the possibility of a southern segment of this system organising into a tropical cyclone; Météo-France (MFR) initially estimated a "very low" chance of a moderate tropical storm materialising from the large circulation near Diego Garcia. Due to strong wind shear, the environment remained unfavourable for tropical development. On 22 July, Météo-France began monitoring the system as a zone of disturbed weather; the system's forward motion was initially southward. A temporary decrease in wind shear on 23 July provided a brief period conducive for tropical development, and the system strengthened to its peak winds of 45 km/h (30 mph) that day. However, the disturbance's centre of circulation remained ill-defined and lacking showers and thunderstorms. Although the disturbance was forecast to initially strengthen into a tropical storm, an increase in wind shear prevented the storm from consolidating further about the centre of circulation and caused the overall wind field to disorganise. The system curved towards the west on 24 July and eventually degenerated into a remnant circulation northeast of Rodrigues by the 25 July; these remnants persisted for another day before dissipating entirely.

=== Tropical Cyclone Belna ===
- Tropical cyclone (MFR)
- Category 3 tropical cyclone (SSHWS)
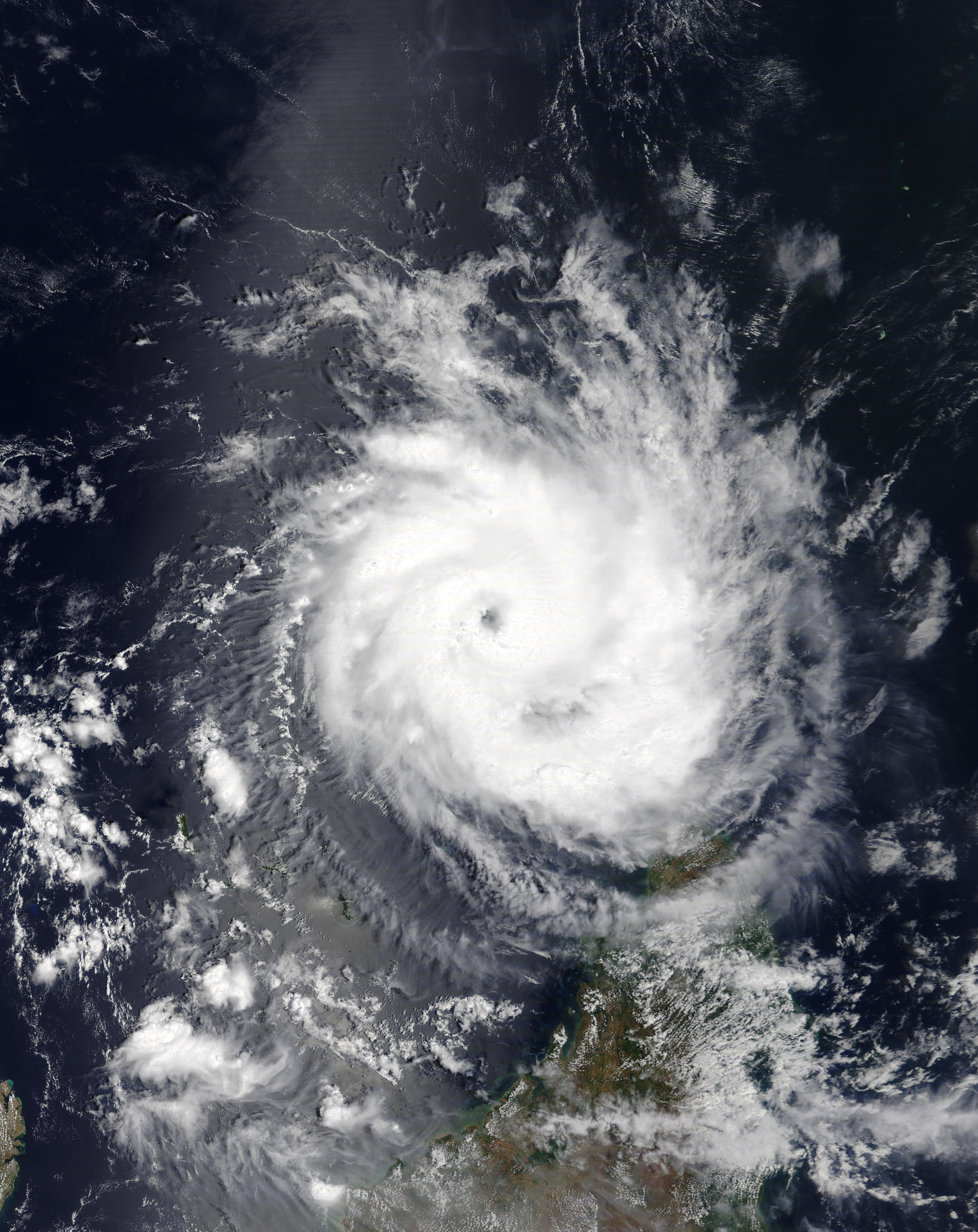
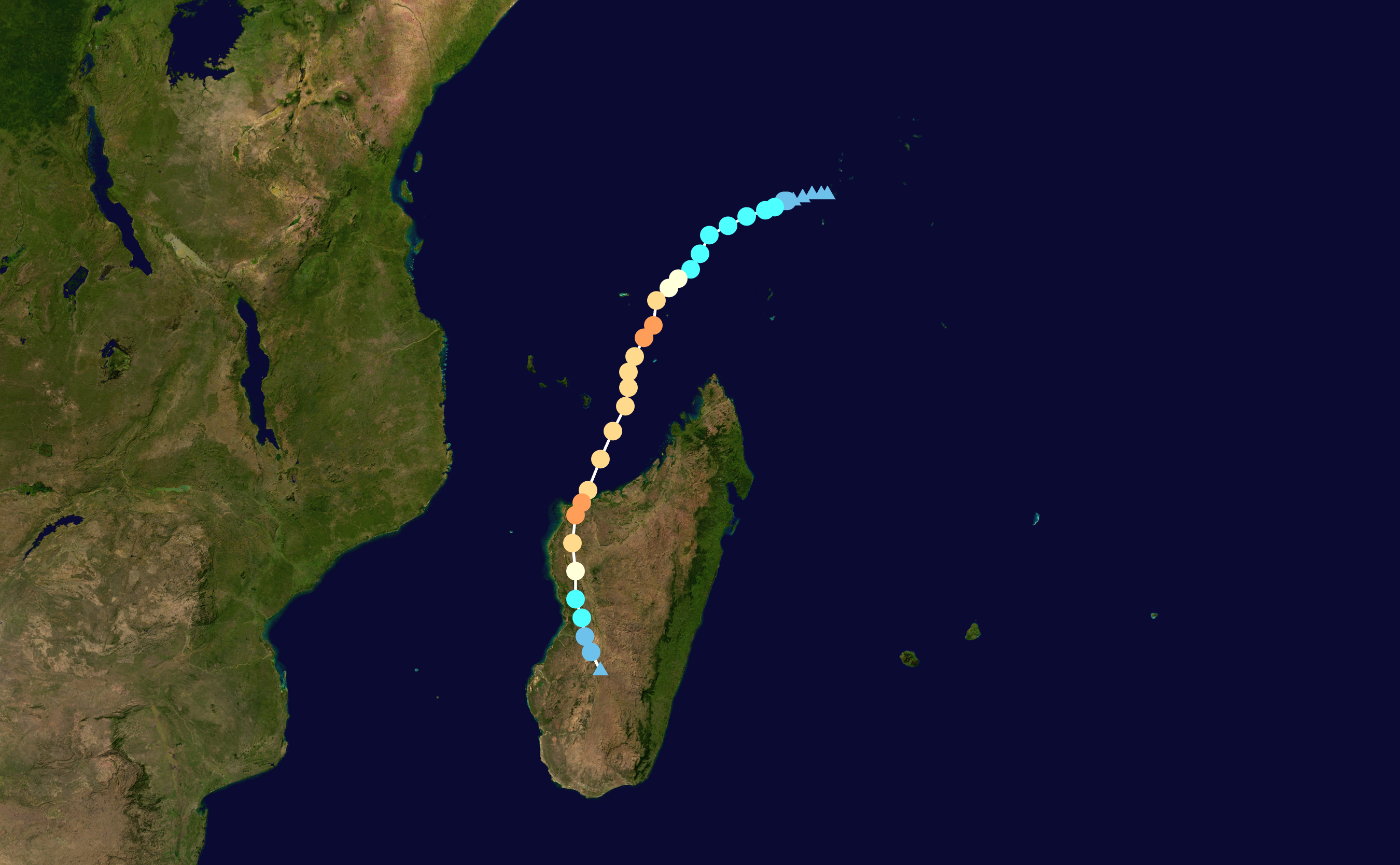
- Duration: 2 December – 11 December
- Peak intensity: 155 km/h (100 mph) (10-min); 965 hPa (mbar)

Météo-France began highlighting the potential for tropical cyclone development in their daily bulletins on 25 November, noting an increase in shower activity west of the Seychelles. Aided by the passage of a Kelvin wave and a favourable window in the Madden–Julian oscillation, a broad trough of low pressure began to take shape within the storm activity, extending across the equator. Projections from computer models remained in disagreement over the system's future, complicated by the concurrent development of a tropical disturbance in the northwestern Indian Ocean along the same trough. A loosely defined wind circulation was detected 263 km (163 mi) south of Mahe, Seychelles on 29 November, offset from convection. Over the following days, this circulation tightened within an environment moderately conducive for tropical development. Météo-France declared the system as a zone of disturbed weather on 2 December; at the time the system had drifted west from its point of origin. Although the storm was better organised and the environment conducive for intensification, the storm's wind field initially remained elongated and rainfall remained north of the storm's centre. The disturbance become a tropical depression on 5 December, attended by an increase in rainbands and the return of convection at the center of circulation; at 18:00 UTC that day, the system was upgraded to Moderate Tropical Storm Belna. Belna was upgraded further to severe tropical storm status early on 6 December. Around the same time, a cloud-obscured eye briefly became apparent in microwave satellite imagery. Due to a strengthening area of high pressure to its east, Belna began to curve from its initial westward drift to a more directed southwestward trajectory. After a brief period of strengthening, Belna's central dense overcast remained largely unchanged throughout 6 December before signs of resumed intensification emerged by the day's end, followed by the development of another eye. With the storm's eye becoming better defined, MFR upgraded Belna to a tropical cyclone early on 7 December. Hot towers were detected atop and within the storm's radius of maximum winds, suggesting the onset of a more accelerated rate of intensification. On 9 December, Belna made landfall near Mayotte and soon began to rapidly weaken, with the winds dropping below tropical-storm-force on the next day. The system dissipated late on 11 December over Haute Matsiatra.

Météo Madagascar first issued green alerts for the Madagascan districts of Diana, Sava, and Sofia on 4 December based on a high probability of Belna impacting northeastern Madagascar. Accordingly, cyclone response measures were activated by the National Office for Risk and Disaster Management and humanitarian organisations across northern Madagascar. Green alerts were later extended to encompass five districts. A cyclone pre-alert was issued for Mayotte on 6 December, succeeded by an orange alert the following day. Civil security personnel from mainland France and Reunion, some from the National Gendarmerie, were sent to Mayotte to aid storm preparation efforts there. Shelters were opened in several Mayotte communes on 7 December. The National Office for Risk and Disaster Management and 11 humanitarian agencies were active in northern Madagascar by 9 December. Belna's effects in Mayotte were minimal as the storm passed 100 km (62 mi) to the east. The worst effects of Belna in Madagascar occurred in Soalala, where the storm made landfall. The roofs of 80% of residences and government buildings in the city were damaged by Belna's winds. Damage to homes displaced 1,400 people in Soalala and another 900 throughout Madagascar. Extensive flooding also affected both Soalala and Antsiranana. Belna's impacts in Madagascar killed nine people and caused at least US$25 million in economic losses.

=== Very Intense Tropical Cyclone Ambali ===
- Very intense tropical cyclone (MFR)
- Category 5 tropical cyclone (SSHWS)
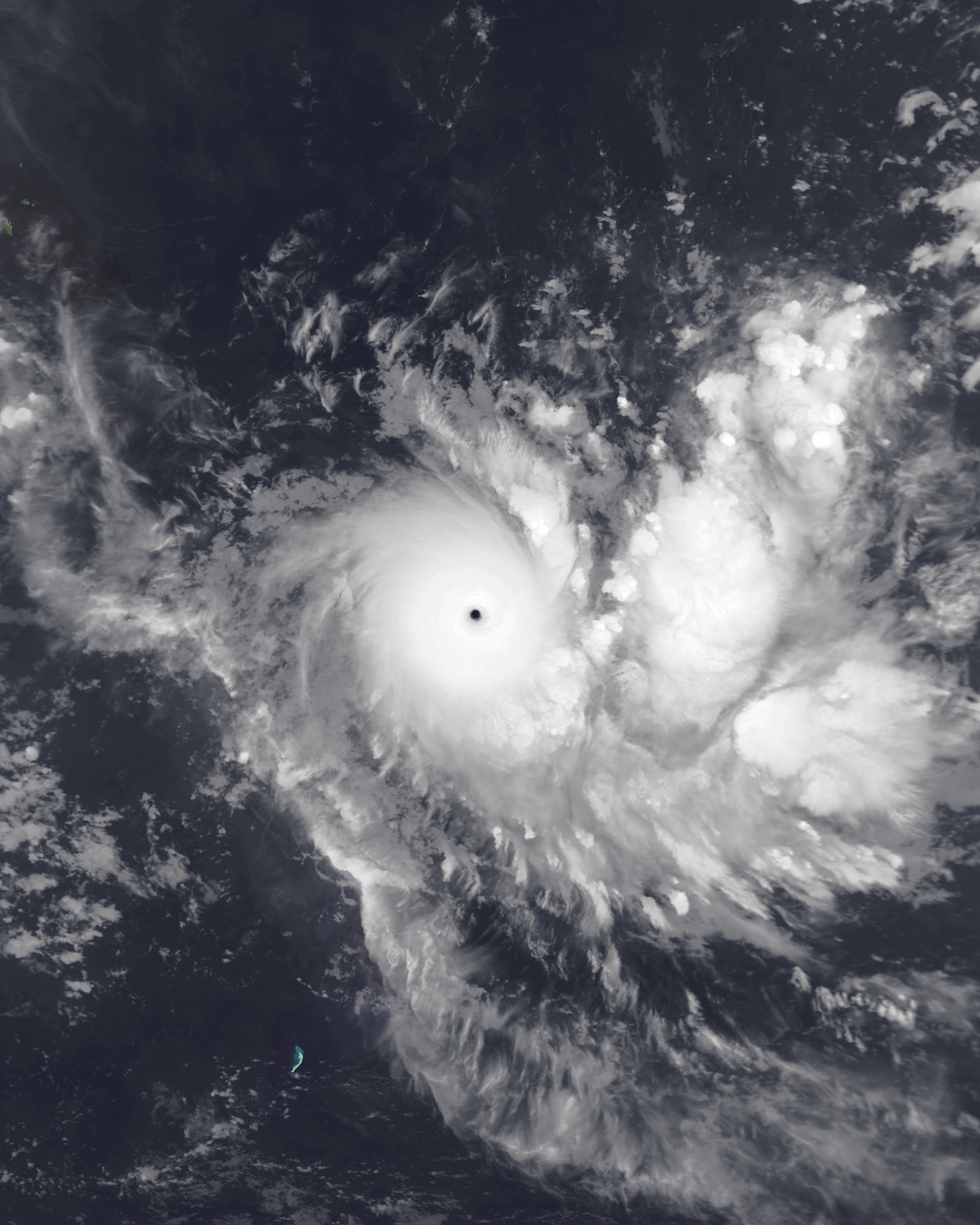
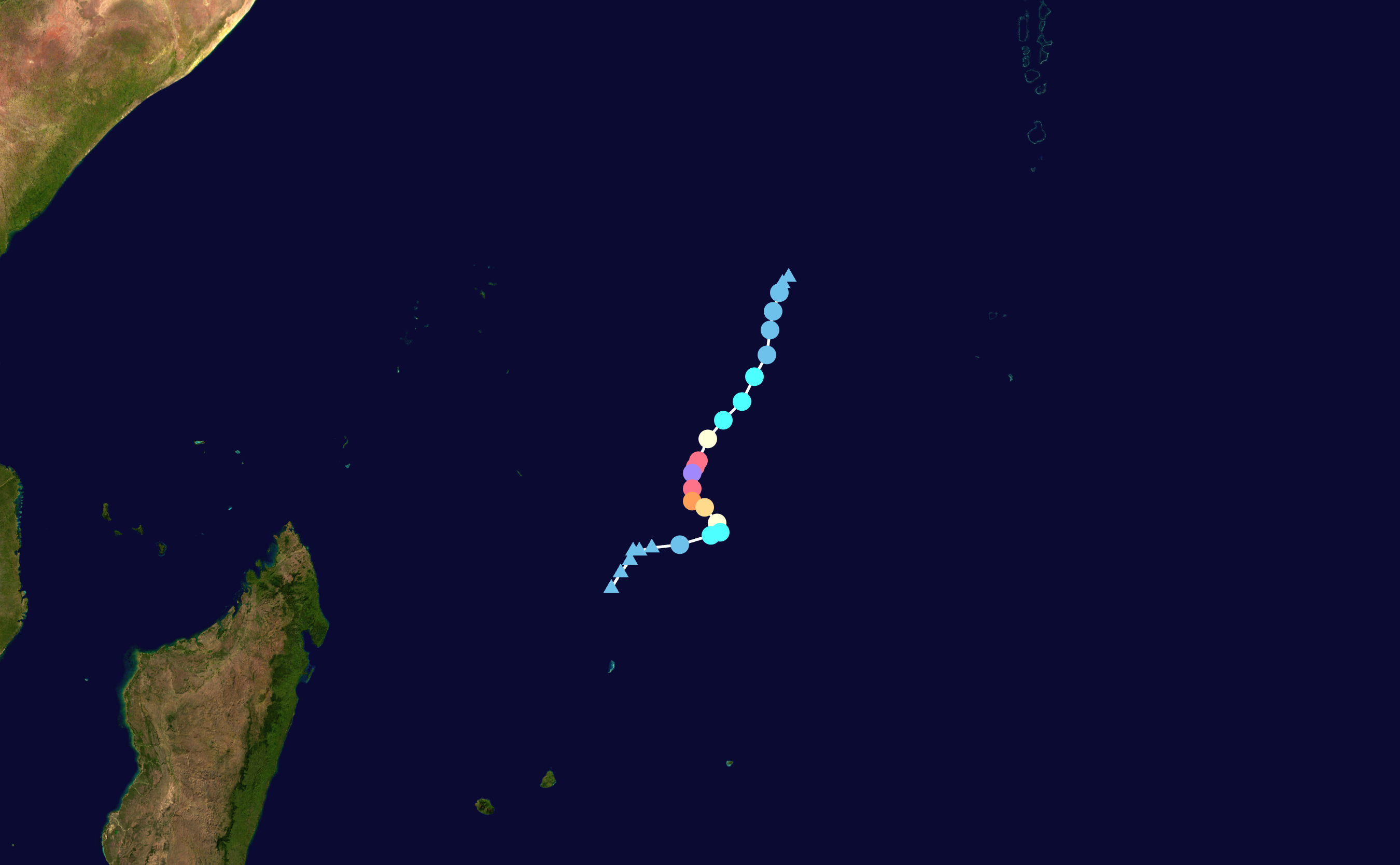
- Duration: 3 December – 7 December
- Peak intensity: 220 km/h (140 mph) (10-min); 930 hPa (mbar)

While Belna was gradually developing out of an extended trough of low pressure, another area of convection formed along the same trough between the Seychelles and the Chagos Archipelago in early December. The system organised quickly, attaining formative rainbands around a coalescing centre of circulation on 3 December. At 06:00 UTC, the system was classified as a Zone of Disturbed Weather. A day later, the system was upgraded to a tropical depression following a significant increase in convection near its centre. Steered by a high-pressure area centred over the southern Indian Ocean, the tropical depression moved south. The quick organisation continued into 5 December, and MFR named the system Moderate Tropical Storm Ambali as a central dense overcast emerged; Ambali intensified into a Severe Tropical Storm a few hours later. Buoyed by a highly favourable environment with waters between 29–30 °C (84–86 °F), explosive intensification ensued, accompanied by the formation of an eye. At 18:00 UTC on 5 December, MFR upgraded Ambali to intense tropical cyclone status following a sharp 80 km/h (50 mph) increase in the storm's winds in 12 hours. The cyclone was highly compact, with a distinct eye 15 km (9 mi) in diameter surrounded by cold cloud tops.

Six hours later, Ambali was reclassified as a very intense tropical cyclone, the highest rating on the MFR's intensity scale and the first in the basin since Fantala in 2016. The agency estimated maximum 10-minute sustained winds of 220 km/h (140 mph) and a minimum pressure of 930 mbar (hPa; 27.46 inHg); concurrently, the Joint Typhoon Warning Center (JTWC) assessed peak 1-minute sustained winds of 250 km/h (155 mph), equivalent to a high-end Category 4 hurricane on the Saffir–Simpson scale (SSHWS). However, in post-season reanalysis, the JTWC reassessed the system as slightly stronger, peaking with 1-min sustained winds of 260 km/h (160 mph), a low-end Category 5-equivalent cyclone (SSHWS). The cyclone's eye had contracted further to a diameter of 9 km (5 mi) early on 6 December at the time of peak intensity. Based on JTWC data, Ambali's winds increased by 185 km/h (115 mph) in 24 hours, marking the fastest 24-hour intensification recorded in the Southern Hemisphere since 1980 and topping the old record set by Cyclone Ernie in 2017, and the second-fastest globally, after only Hurricane Patricia. A gradual weakening trend soon succeeded the rapid intensification episode as indicated by a clouding-over of the small eye. Within a few hours of Ambali's peak strength, the eye was no longer apparent on infrared satellite imagery; dry air became wrapped close to the core of the cyclone's compact circulation. Impaired further by an increase in wind shear, Ambali's strength quickly diminished throughout 6 December, and by the following day, its winds fell below tropical cyclone thresholds. Despite otherwise inhibiting environmental factors, the eye reappeared for a two-hour period before fully succumbing to the dry air and 55 km/h (35 mph) wind shear. Rapid weakening soon proceeded, and by mid-day on 7 December, the storm's coldest cloud tops were displaced east of the center of circulation; Ambali's motion also became erratic as winds in the lower levels of the troposphere began to govern its track. On 8 December, Ambali degenerated to a remnant low and MFR issued their last advisory on the dissipating system.

=== Tropical Cyclone Calvinia ===
- Tropical cyclone (MFR)
- Category 1 tropical cyclone (SSHWS)
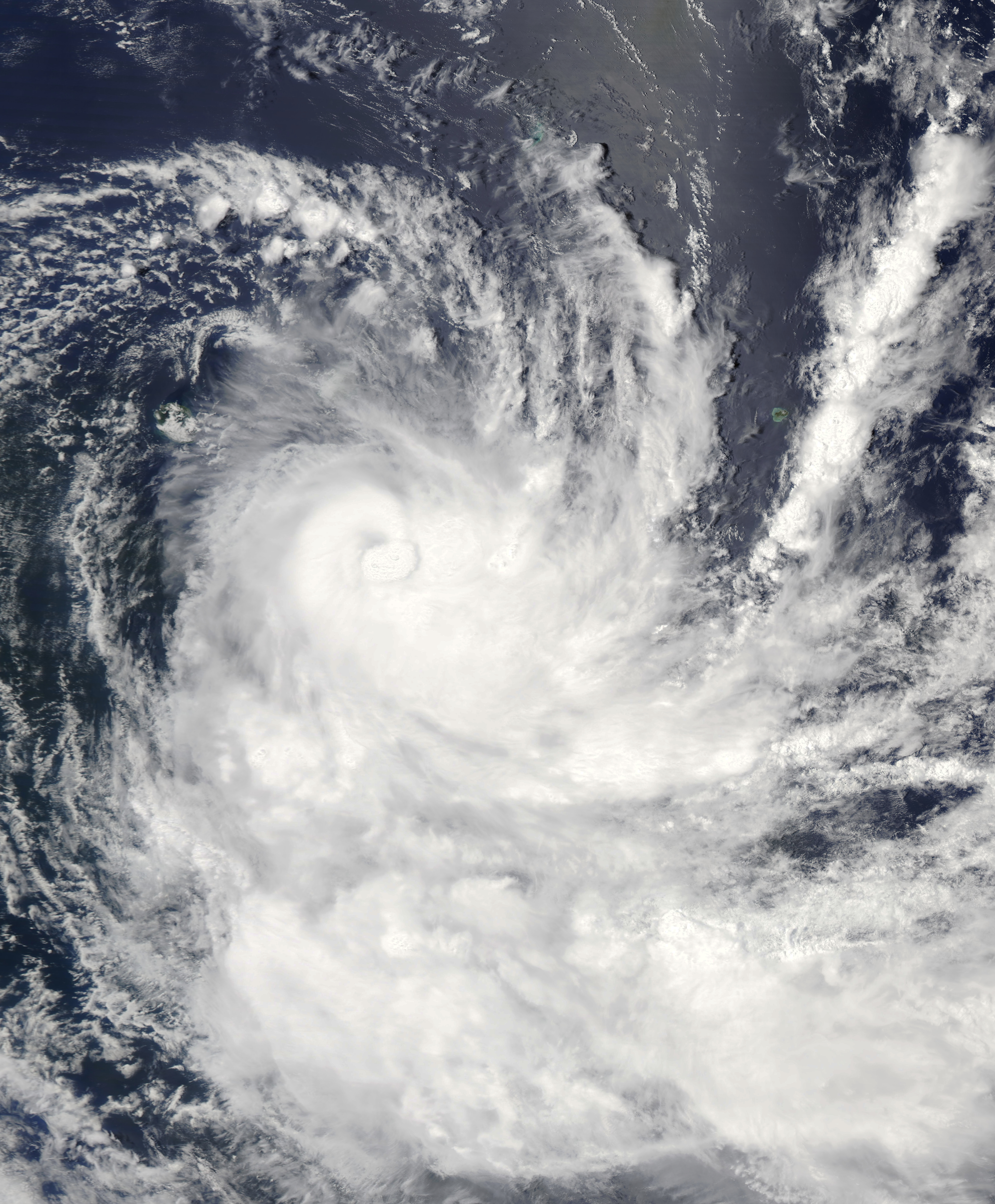
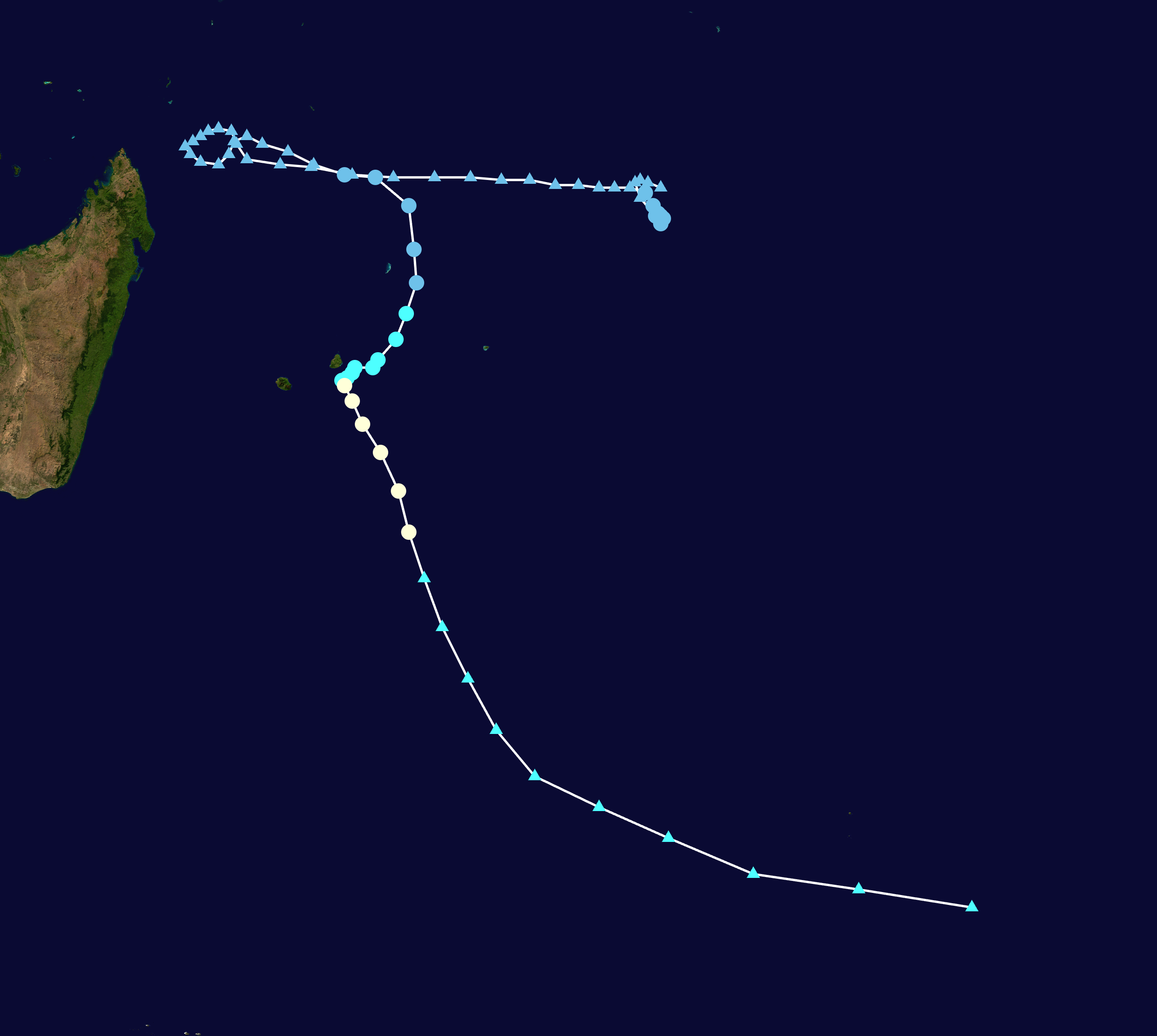
- Duration: 27 December – 1 January
- Peak intensity: 120 km/h (75 mph) (10-min); 970 hPa (mbar)

The origin of Calvinia can be traced back to an area of persistent showers and thunderstorms southwest of Diego Garcia first noted by the JTWC on 16 December. The system featured a loosely defined circulation upon designation, but computer models indicated that tropical cyclogenesis intermediately was unlikely. The storm complex drifted southward over the next two days, and an increase in organisation briefly prompted the issuance of a Tropical Cyclone Formation Alert (TCFA) on 18 December before an increase in wind shear cut development of the system short, leading to alert's cancellation despite the system producing storm-force winds. The system then slowly curved to the west towards Madagascar, eventually moving into a much more favorable environment enhanced by a passing Kelvin wave by 25 December. Two days later, MFR designated the system as a Zone of Disturbed Weather; the disturbance was initially broad and had two areas of rotation. The next day, MFR upgraded the system to a Tropical Depression while the JTWC issued a second TCFA. Tracking southward, the depression strengthened and became a Moderate Tropical Storm on 29 December, gaining the name Calvinia.

Dry air and wind shear afflicted the nascent storm early in its development, limiting convection to the southern half of Calvinia's circulation. The storm remained asymmetric but showed signs of improvement on 29 December as the environment became more favourable for intensification, with rainbands redeveloping near the center of the storm. Concurrently, Calvinia turned towards the southwest and slowed down as it neared Mauritius. The next morning, a small eye emerged within the quasi-stationary Calvinia on radar imagery from the Mascarene Islands, allowing the MFR to upgrade Calvinia to a Severe Tropical Storm that day. The eye was later evident on satellite imagery, indicative of continued intensification. After the eye had collapsed yet again, an area of high pressure to Calvinia's southeast then began to steer the storm slowly towards the south and away from the Mascarene Islands on 30 December. Shortly after it began to track away from Mauritius, the storm intensified further into a Category 1 hurricane-equivalent storm and another eye began to appear on satellite imagery on 31 December. Shortly after, the MFR also upgraded Calvinia to a tropical cyclone. Not too long after intensifying, the storm accelerated southwestwards and significantly weakened on 1 January. As a result, the MFR issued their final advisory on the system as it turned extratropical.

All the three major Mascarene Islands were placed under a pre-cyclonic alert on 29 December. Mauritius Meteorological Services issued a class III warning for Mauritius on 29 December, indicating the forecast onset of 120 km/h (75 mph) wind gusts. Several key services in Mauritius were closed ahead of Calvinia's approach, including Sir Seewoosagur Ramgoolam International Airport and the Port Louis Harbour amid the country's peak tourism season, effectively suspending external trade with Mauritius. The Stock Exchange of Mauritius suspended operations, and most other shops and businesses in Port Louis also closed. Air Mauritius postponed all of its flights indefinitely. Evacuation shelters on Mauritius housed 298 refugees during the storm, with a total of 168 shelters opened. The centre of Calvinia was 60 km (37 mi) from Mauritius at its closest approach on 31 December. Stormy conditions prevailed on the island, causing flooding in some areas. Power outages affected 6,000 families in Union Vale and Ferney. Rains from Calvinia caused flooding in southern Réunion, blocking roads in Saint Louis and L'Étang-Salé. The storm also caused minor damage on the island, knocking down trees and power lines. Water utility company Sudéau reported several incidents to its water distribution systems during the storm. A 325 mm (12.8 in)-rainfall total was recorded in Dimitile, while a peak wind gust of 122 km/h (76 mph) was measured in Plaine des Cafres.

=== Tropical Depression 05 ===
- Tropical depression (MFR)
- Tropical storm (SSHWS)
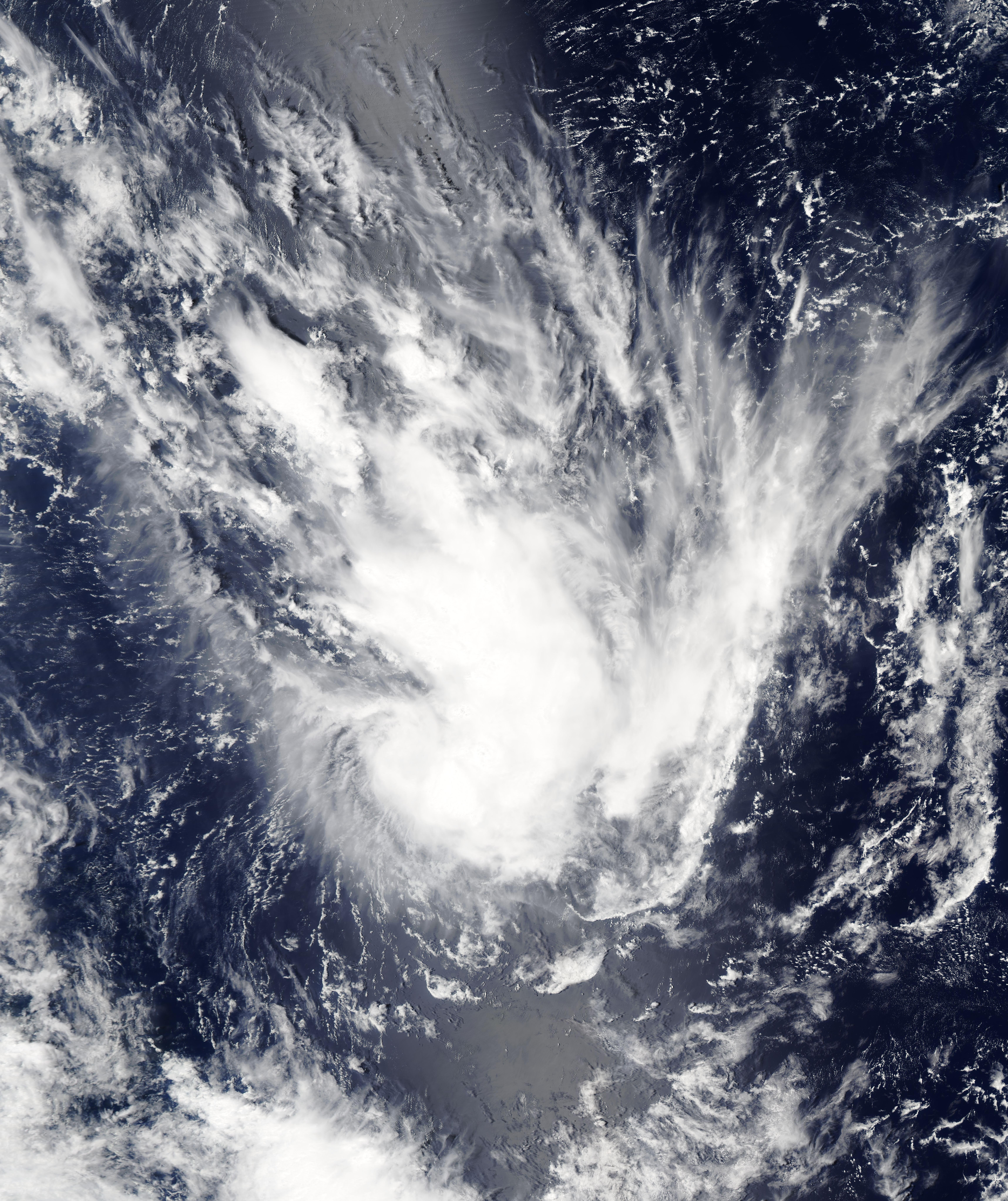
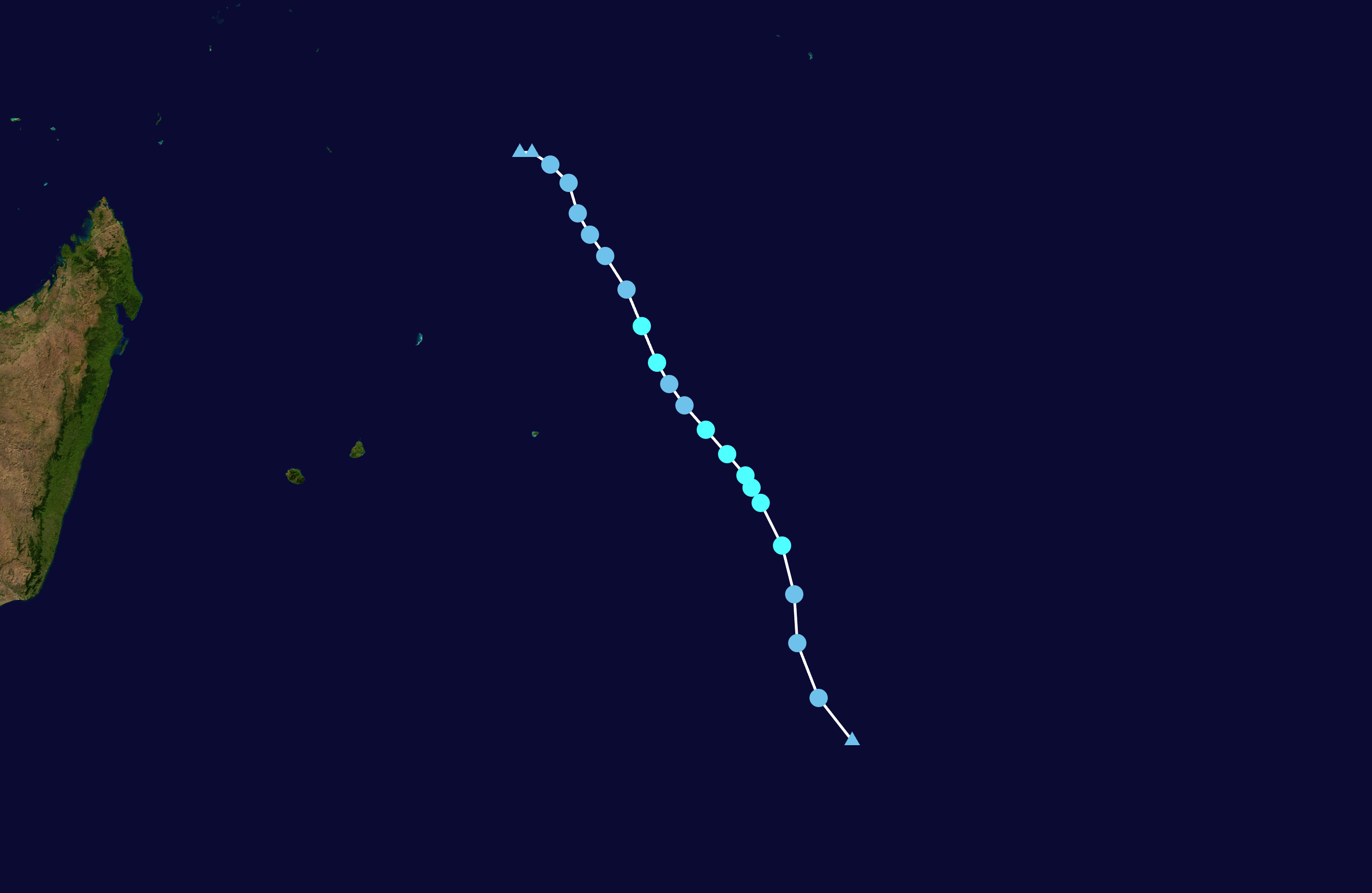
- Duration: 19 January – 23 January
- Peak intensity: 55 km/h (35 mph) (10-min); 999 hPa (mbar)

In mid-January 2020, a monsoon trough began to produce persistent convection over the southwestern Indian Ocean near the Chagos Archipelago. An elongated wind circulation slowly developed within this aggregation of storms moving towards the southeast. MFR classified the system as a Zone of Disturbed Weather on 19 January and initiated advisories two days later. Due to strong wind shear and low-level convergence, conditions were unfavourable for substantial intensification. Strong convective bursts occurred in response to an attenuation of wind shear, leading the MFR to reclassify the system to a Tropical Disturbance on 22 January; nonetheless, the system remained generally disorganised as the center of circulation remained near the edge of the associated shower activity. The JTWC classified the asymmetric disturbance, now 1,315 km (817 mi) east of Mauritius, as a tropical storm later that day. On 23 January, the MFR upgraded the system to a tropical depression as convection continued to strengthen further in tandem with the diminishing of vertical wind shear; however, this period of strengthening was cut short by the storm's trajectory towards the subtropical jet stream. Coupled with a return of wind shear and cooling sea surface temperatures, shower activity associated with the storm quickly diminished; both the MFR and JTWC issued their final advisories on the storm on 23 January.

=== Moderate Tropical Storm Diane ===
- Moderate tropical storm (MFR)
- Tropical storm (SSHWS)
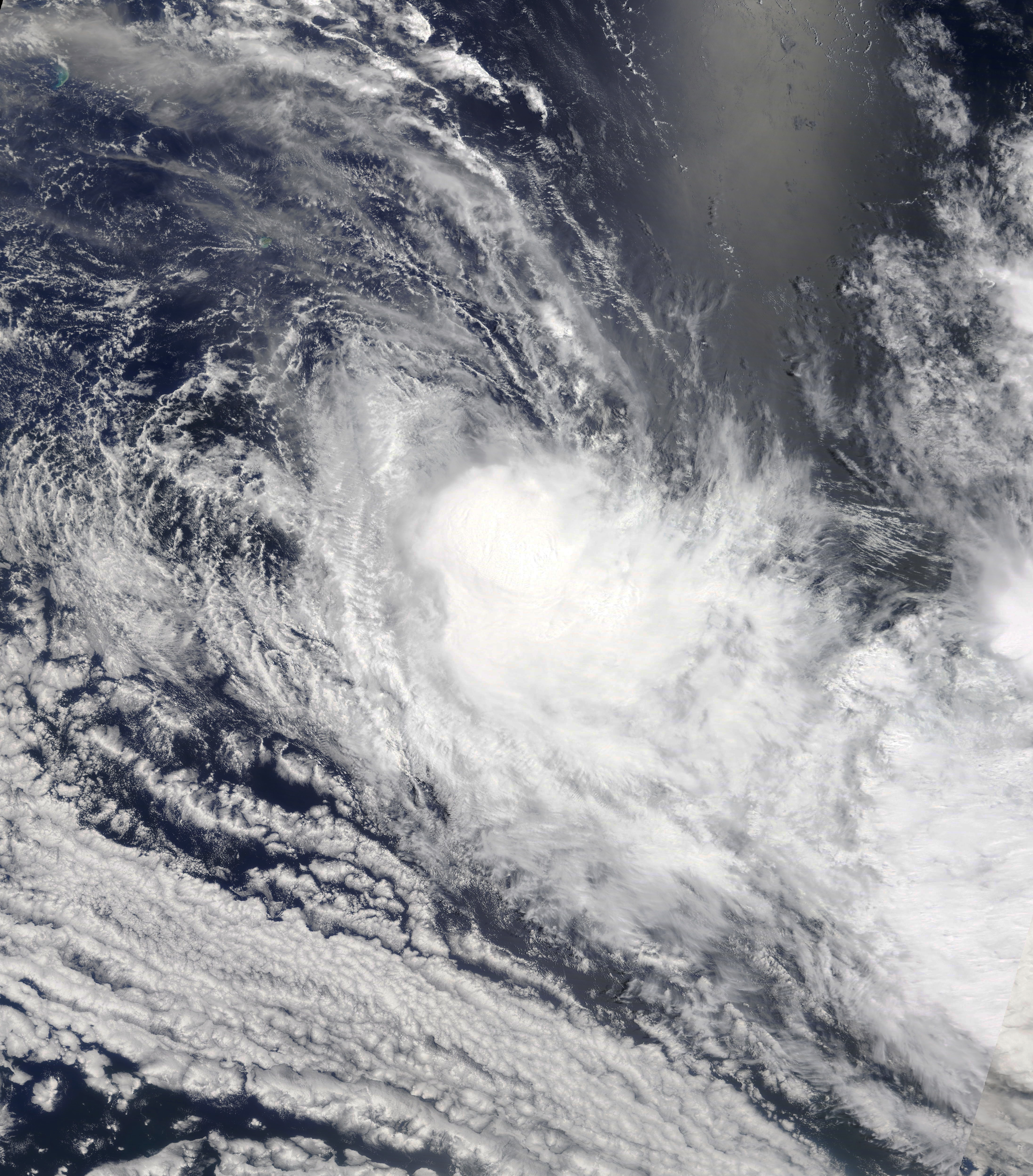
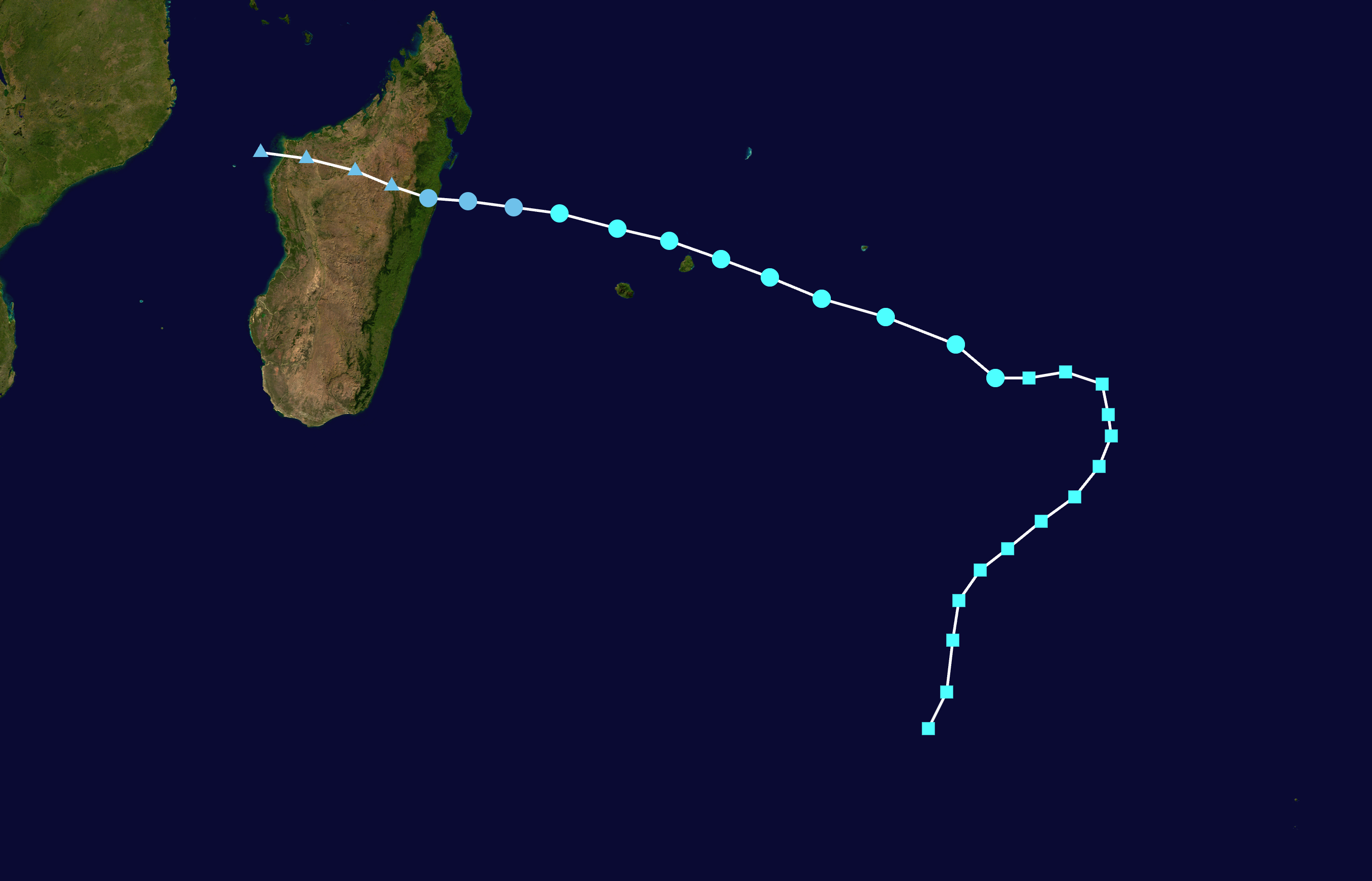
- Duration: 22 January – 26 January
- Peak intensity: 75 km/h (45 mph) (10-min); 990 hPa (mbar)

As early as 11 January, long-range ensemble forecast guidance from the European Centre for Medium-Range Weather Forecasts suggested the possibility of a storm forming over the Mozambique Channel. A low-pressure area eventually formed over southern Africa by 18 January, and was forecast by the MFR to develop within the channel as part of a complex series of developing low-pressure minima along a monsoon trough extending across Madagascar. A centre of circulation of monsoonal character began to develop on 22 January between Juan de Nova Island and the western Malagasy coast, prompting the MFR to designate the system as Zone of Disturbed Weather 06. The incipient disturbance tracked eastward across Madagascar, maintaining a corridor of strong winds. By the afternoon of 23 January, the centre of the system emerged over the Indian Ocean. The system then began to slowly consolidate with the aid of warm ocean waters, with the MFR upgrading it to a tropical depression on 24 January. The presence of a trough to the south and an equatorial ridge to the north produced a westerly flow in the region, resulting in an unusual eastward track towards the Mascarene Islands. Based on satellite analysis and scatterometer data, the depression strengthened further near Mauritius to a Moderate Tropical Storm by 18:00 UTC on 24 January and received the name Diane. The centre of Diane tracked 30 km (19 mi) north of Mauritius roughly three hours later. Diane's southeasterly motion lessened the inhibitory effects of wind shear, allowing the storm to intensify as indicated by improved convection on the storm's southern side. Deep convection around the central dense overcast remained persistent, and as a result MFR upgraded Diane to Severe Tropical Storm status on 26 January. Diane continued southeast throughout the day, and a combination of wind shear and interaction with a baroclinic zone caused Diane to begin losing tropical characteristics. Much of Diane's convection eventually diminished, and Diane was reported to have fully lost its tropical characteristics later on 26 January, leading MFR to issue its final tropical advisories on the system. The extratropical remnants of Diane continued to persist for an additional two days, curving towards the southwest before MFR issued its last bulletin on the system on 28 January.

Diane's precursor disturbance worsened flood conditions in Madagascar, producing heavy rainfall; 129 mm (5.1 in) of rain fell in Antsohihy amid widespread rainfall totals of 50 mm (2.0 in). Effects were most prevalent in seven districts in northern Madagascar, where nearly 107,000 people were affected. Thousands of hectares of land and more than 10,600 homes were inundated by floodwaters; of the homes, 146 were destroyed. Thirty-one people were killed, primarily by drowning, according to the Bureau National de Gestion des Risques et des Catastrophes. The Malagasy government declared a state of emergency for Madagascar on 24 January. A yellow cyclone pre-alert was issued by MFR for Reunion on 23 January, eventually superseded by an orange pre-alert. The University of Reunion Island closed all of its campuses ahead of Diane. Southern parts of Reunion were most heavily affected by Diane's rainfall. In Les Makes, 460 mm (18 in) of rain was recorded. Several rafts at river crossings were flooded, truncating roads. A level 3 alert was issued for Mauritius and a level 1 alert for Rodrigues on 24 January; these alerts were lifted the next day. In Mauritius, 1,121 people sought refuge in 23 evacuation centres. Sir Seewoosagur Ramgoolam International Airport closed for 19 hours as Diane passed to the north. Flights to Rodrigues were cancelled on 25 January.

=== Moderate Tropical Storm Esami ===
- Moderate tropical storm (MFR)
- Tropical storm (SSHWS)
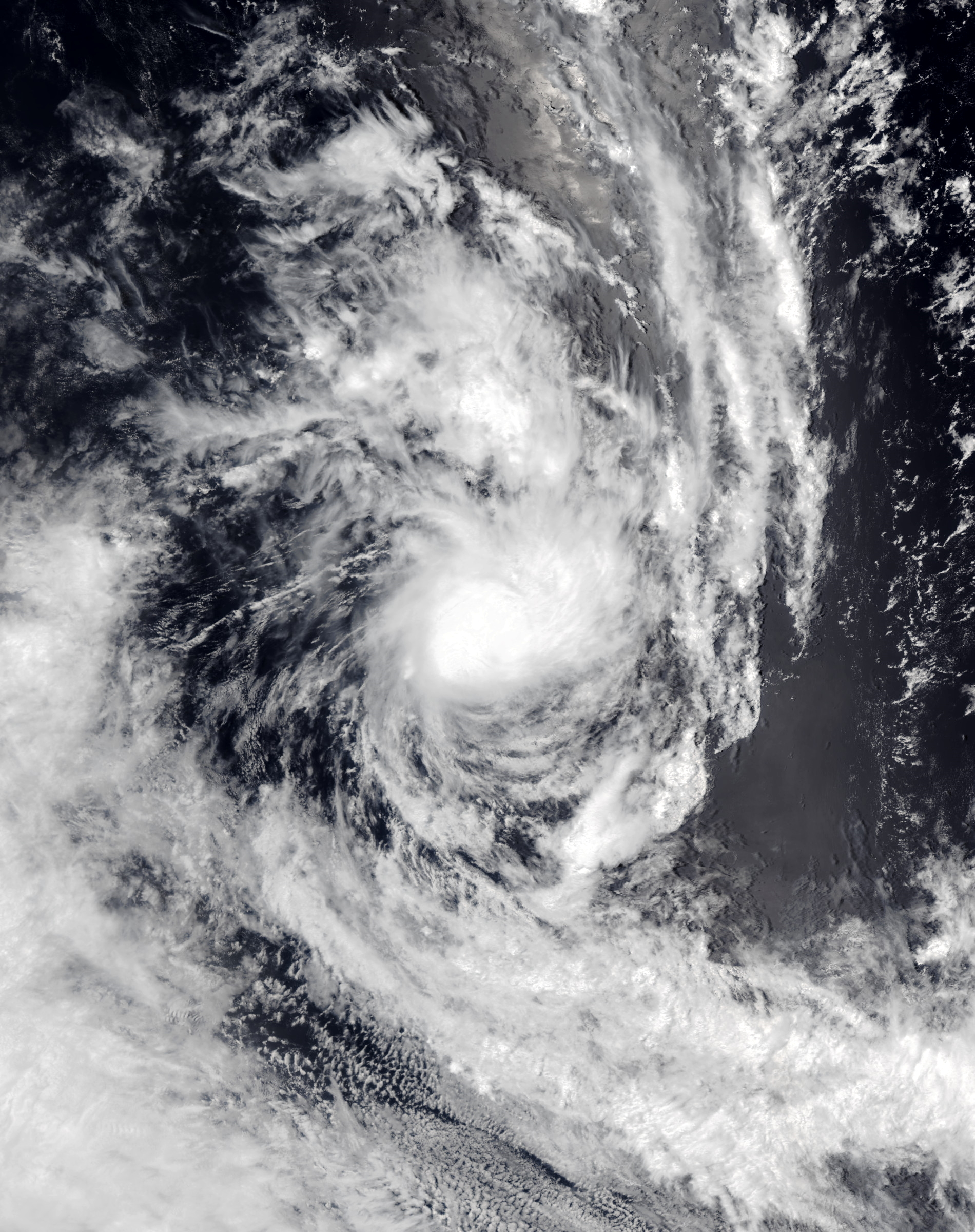
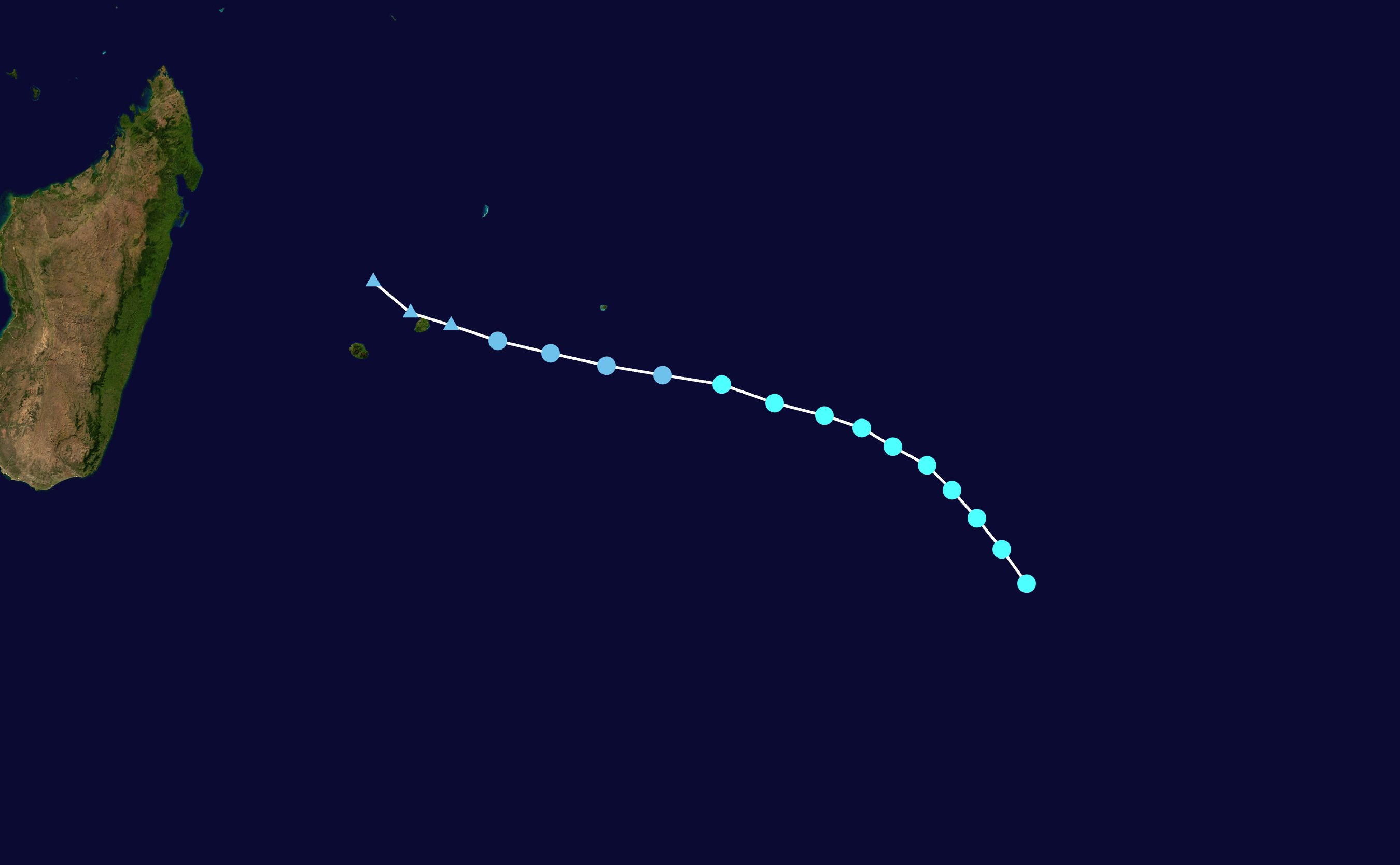
- Duration: 23 January – 26 January
- Peak intensity: 85 km/h (50 mph) (10-min); 990 hPa (mbar)

Beginning on 16 January, MFR began to note the potential of a disturbance forming east of Madagascar during the same active period that would eventually spawn both Tropical Depression 05 and Moderate Tropical Storm Diane. A convergence zone had persisted over the region and was expected to evolve into a monsoon trough from which tropical cyclones could develop. On 22 January, a low-pressure area with multiple circulation centres developed near the Mascarene Islands between the weakening Tropical Depression 05 and then-Tropical Disturbance 06 (which would later become Moderate Tropical Storm Diane). The MFR did not forecast tropical cyclogenesis at the time due to the presence of unfavourable atmospheric conditions. However, a more well-defined circulation quickly took hold with an associated curved rainband appearing on the system, leading MFR to designate the system as Tropical Disturbance 07 between Mauritius and Rodrigues on 23 January. Due to westerly flow in the mid-troposphere, the newly classified disturbance took an east-southeasterly course. Though the storm's convection was variable, wind shear limited convection to the northern quadrants of the circulation. The disturbance was upgraded to a Tropical Depression based on scatterometer data later that day.

It continued to intensify, developing a quickly evolving and compact area of central overcast, receiving the name Esami as it intensified into a Moderate Tropical Storm on 25 January. Dry air and wind shear generated by the nearby Moderate Tropical Storm Diane to the storm's west resulted in Esami maintaining a lopsided appearance with the strongest winds and convection limited to the eastern part of the wind circulation. This dry air was later entrained to the centre of Esami, exposing the center of circulation and displacing convection from it. According to MFR, Esami's 10-minute maximum sustained winds topped out at 75 km/h (45 mph) early on 25 January. The passage of a trough to Esami's south drew the storm increasingly poleward, causing its track to curve towards the south-southeast. On 26 January, Esami began to interact with a baroclinic zone associated with the subtropical jet stream, causing Esami to lose its tropical characteristics. At 12:00 UTC that day, MFR re-classified Esami as a post-tropical depression.

=== Moderate Tropical Storm Francisco ===
- Moderate tropical storm (MFR)
- Tropical storm (SSHWS)
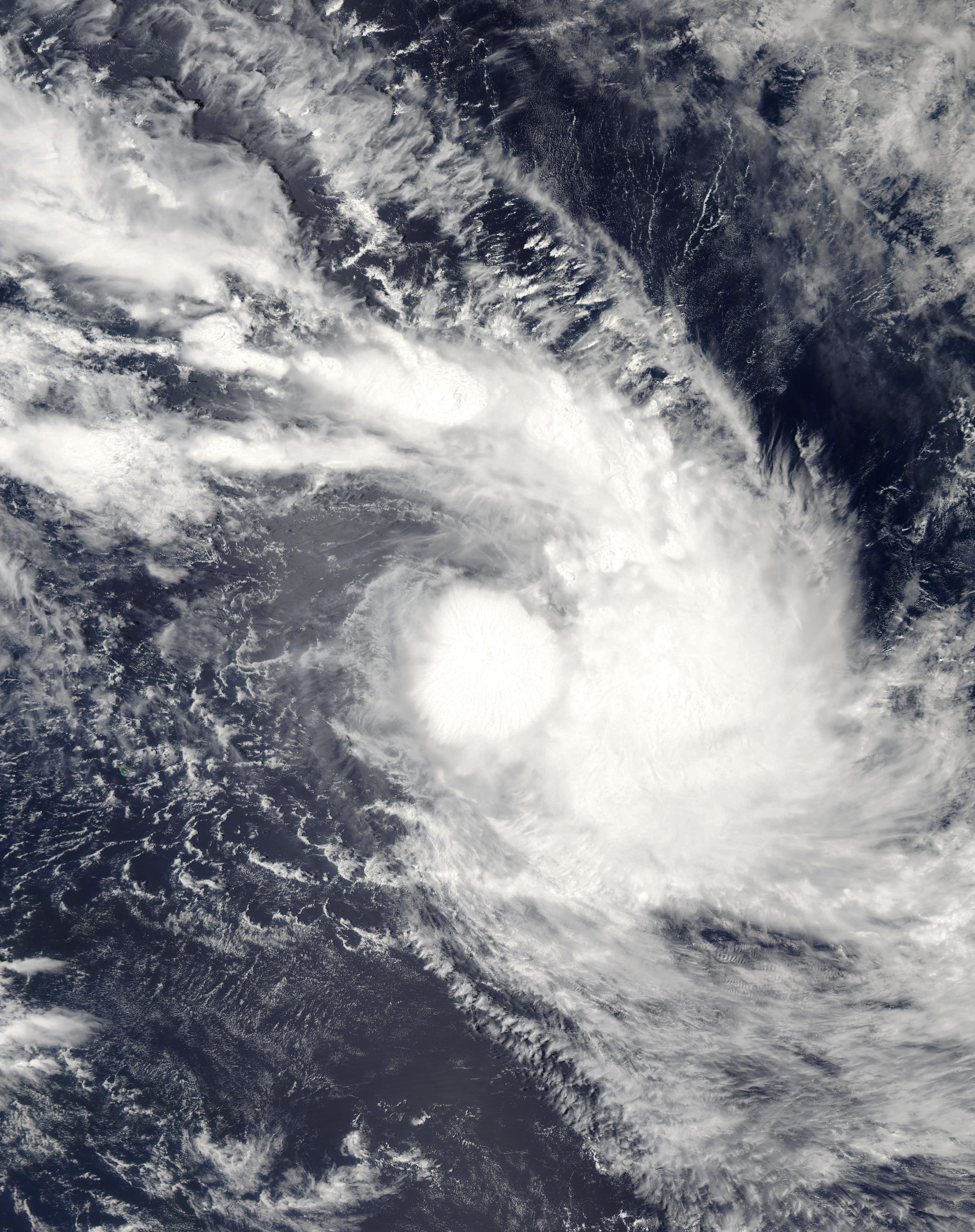
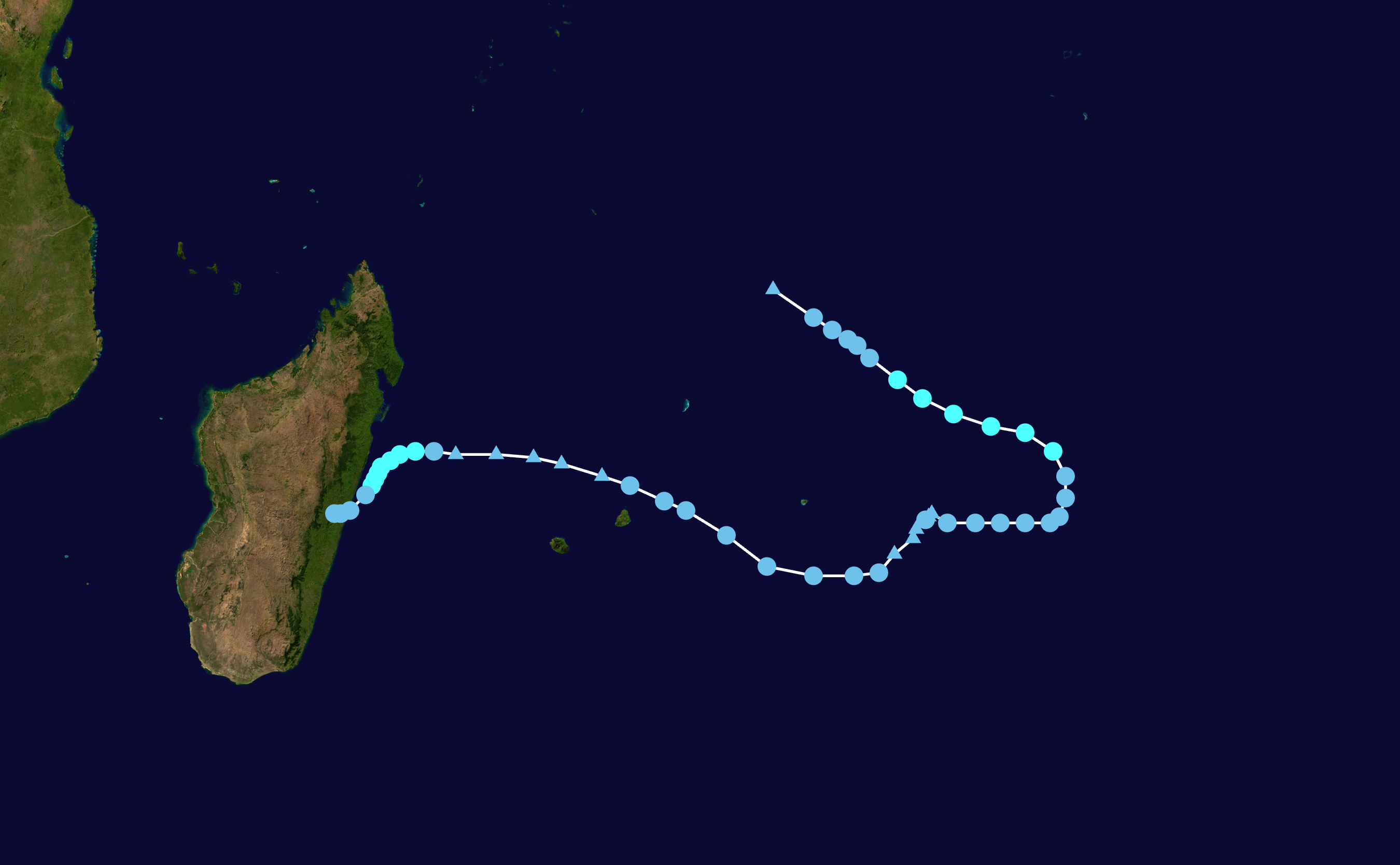
- Duration: 3 February – 15 February
- Peak intensity: 85 km/h (50 mph) (10-min); 995 hPa (mbar)

Towards the end of January and the beginning of February, a convectively-active monsoon trough persisted across much of the southwestern Indian Ocean, generally northeast of Madagascar. Regions of rotation began to develop within the complex of showers by 1 February, and due to the favourable atmospheric conditions, MFR highlighted the possibility of tropical cyclogenesis in three locations. Later that day, the JTWC began monitoring a more coherent area of convection associated with loosely defined rotation approximately 900 km (560 mi) southeast of Seychelles. Slow consolidation occurred as the complex of showers and thunderstorms meandered southwards near the Chagos Archipelago. MFR classified the system as a Zone of Disturbed Weather on 3 February, and advisories were initiated the next day following detection of an elongated circulation alongside increased convection and wind curvature. The storm took an initially southwest track before curving southeastwards along the periphery of a nearby subtropical ridge. With improving organisation, the disturbance was upgraded to a Tropical Depression on 4 February during a brief timeframe supportive of intensification.

On 5 February, MFR upgraded the system to a Moderate Tropical Storm as a strong curved rainband developed; following routine, the Mauritius Meteorological Services named the storm Francisco. Although Francisco's cloud pattern evolved into a central dense overcast, the 75 km/h (45 mph) 10-minute sustained wind assessed upon its upgrade to a tropical storm was ultimately the peak intensity of Francisco's first iteration. Northwesterly vertical wind shear accompanied by dry air in the mid-levels of the troposphere soon began to afflict the tropical storm, making its wind circulation increasingly ill-defined. The wind shear caused the bulk of Francisco's deep convection to shift southeast away from the center of circulation. Although gale-force winds were still present, Francisco was downgraded to a Zone of Disturbed Weather on 6 February as the circulation center became increasingly difficult to identify. Unfavourable atmospheric conditions remained in place throughout most of the day, but an attenuation of wind shear allowed some maintenance of the storm's convection. MFR issued a final bulletin on Francisco on 7 February following the disappearance of most of the storm's convection. However, the system's wind circulation remained well-defined as the remnants curved west.

Over the following week, Francisco's remnants continued west to west-northwest, and dry air was initially forecast to prevent any deep convection from reemerging. However, improved atmospheric conditions allowed for a burst of convection atop a well-defined circulation on 13 February as it was just east of Madagascar, prompting MFR to reinitiate advisories on the system as Tropical Depression Francisco. The regenerated storm tracked slowly south-southwest and quickly acquired compact rainbands, becoming a Moderate Tropical Storm the following day. An eye-like feature was observable on microwave satellite imagery around the time Francisco reached its peak strength with sustained winds of 85 km/h (55 mph) on 15 February. Later that day, Francisco made landfall on the eastern coast of Madagascar near Mahanoro and quickly weakened over land; satellite data and surface observations suggested that any low-level circulation abated by 16 February. Warnings for heavy rainfall were issued for several Malagasy districts as Francisco's second iteration approached from the east; red vigilance advisories were issued for four Malagasy districts. The Indian Ocean Regional Intervention Platform in Reunion provisioned relief supplies for shipment to Antananarivo with availability to 650 families. Persistently heavy rains inundated areas of Toamasina, submerging roads. Entire neighborhoods were flooded in Mahanoro and other nearby districts. A child was killed in Vatomandry following the collapse of a house.

=== Intense Tropical Cyclone Gabekile ===
- Intense tropical cyclone (MFR)
- Category 2 tropical cyclone (SSHWS)
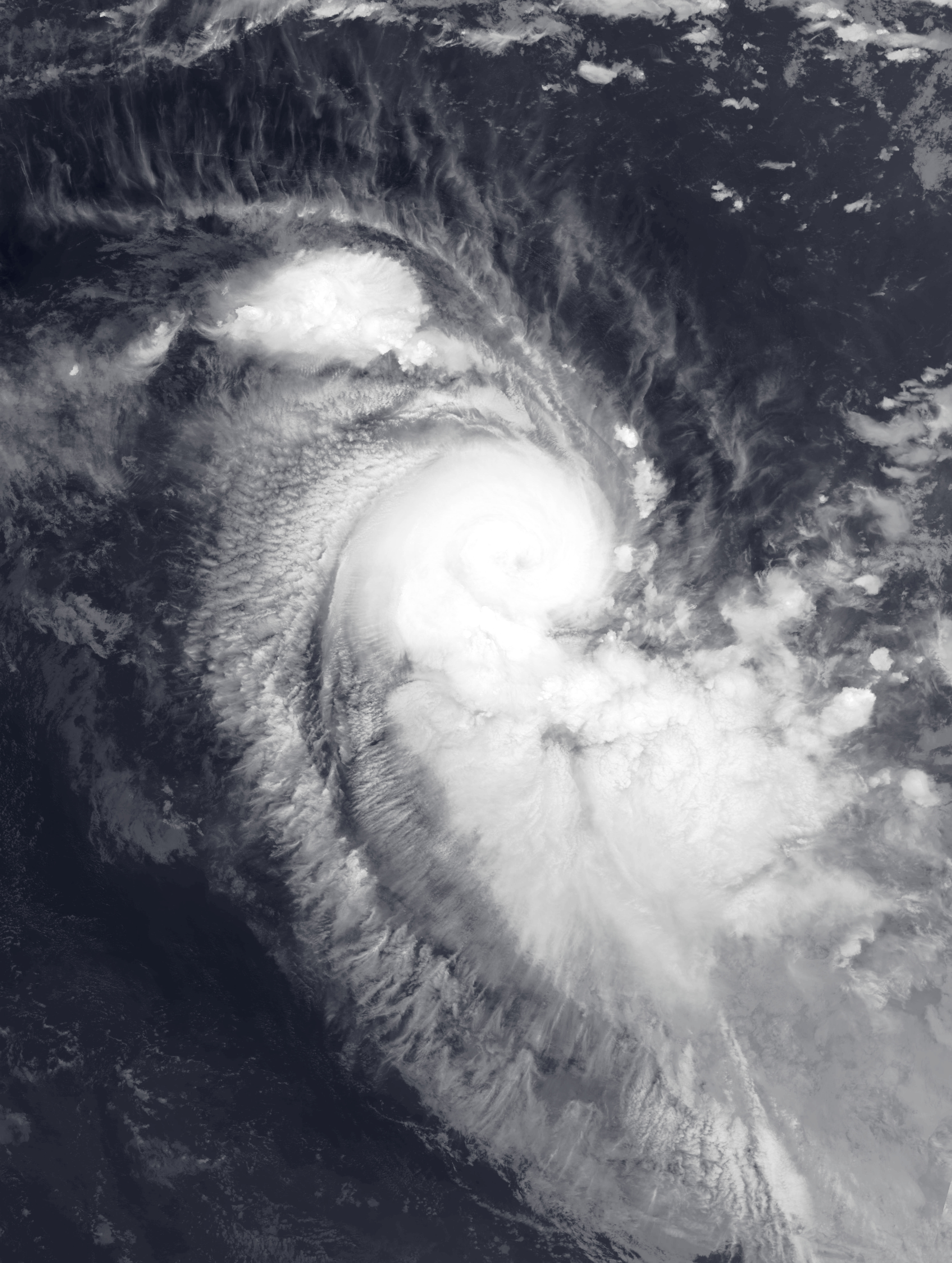
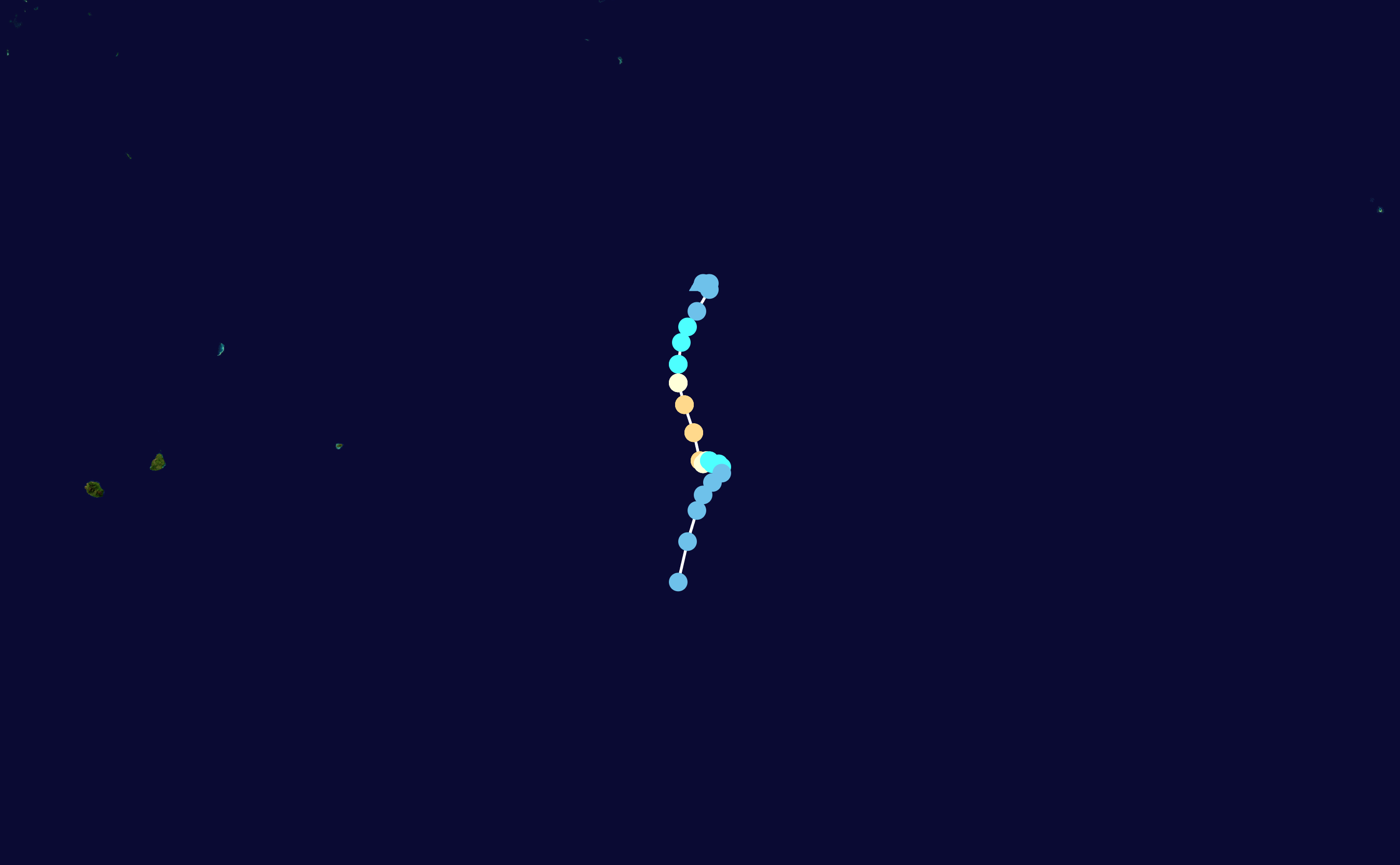
- Duration: 13 February – 17 February
- Peak intensity: 165 km/h (105 mph) (10-min); 950 hPa (mbar)

Due to the anticipated convergence of favourable environmental parameters for development, MFR's tropical weather discussions began to highlight the possibility of a storm gradually developing in the eastern part of the South-West Indian Ocean basin on 9 February. A broad circulation in the lower troposphere and embedded within a monsoon trough began to take shape in this region on 12 February. The MFR designated the burgeoning system as a Zone of Disturbed Weather at 18:00 UTC on 13 February and began issuing advisories a day later. The presence of a subtropical ridge to Gabekile's east led to the storm taking a predominantly southward track. Although its associated showers were initially disorganised, a burst of convection early on 15 February allowed the disturbance to quickly develop. The system was named Gabekile by the Mauritius Meteorological Services upon strengthening into a Moderate Tropical Storm at 06:00 UTC on 15 February. Gabekile was upgraded to a Severe Tropical Storm six hours later as its convection evolved into a central dense overcast with a nascent eye. Aided by conducive environmental conditions, Gabekile intensified into a tropical cyclone by 16 February, presenting a small eye surrounded by a central region of cold cloud tops. Its maximum sustained winds were estimated at 130 km/h (80 mph) with gusts to 185 km/h (115 mph).

After intensifying from a tropical depression to a tropical cyclone in 24 hours, Gabekile held tropical cyclone intensity for less than 12 hours. Cloud tops warmed following its peak intensity and the western eyewall degraded, leading to a decrease in the cyclone's analysed strength. By 12:00 UTC on 16 February, Gabekile had weakened to a Severe Tropical Storm coincident with the eye's dispersal on both infrared and visible satellite imagery. The weakening storm's convective structure fluctuated considerably throughout the day in response to an increase northwesterly wind shear, accentuated by an intrusion of dry air into the storm's circulation. Concurrently, Gabekile location in a barometric col—a region with weak steering currents—caused the storm's initially southward trek to become nearly stationary. Gabekile's winds diminished to Moderate Tropical Storm-force on 17 February as the continued presence of dry air dissipated most of the associated shower and thunderstorm activity. MFR downgraded Gabekile to a remnant area of low pressure on 18 February once the center of circulation became devoid of prolonged convection. Gabekile's remnants drifted southward and acquired post-tropical characteristics upon interacting with an upper-level trough on 19 February.

=== Intense Tropical Cyclone Herold ===
- Intense tropical cyclone (MFR)
- Category 3 tropical cyclone (SSHWS)
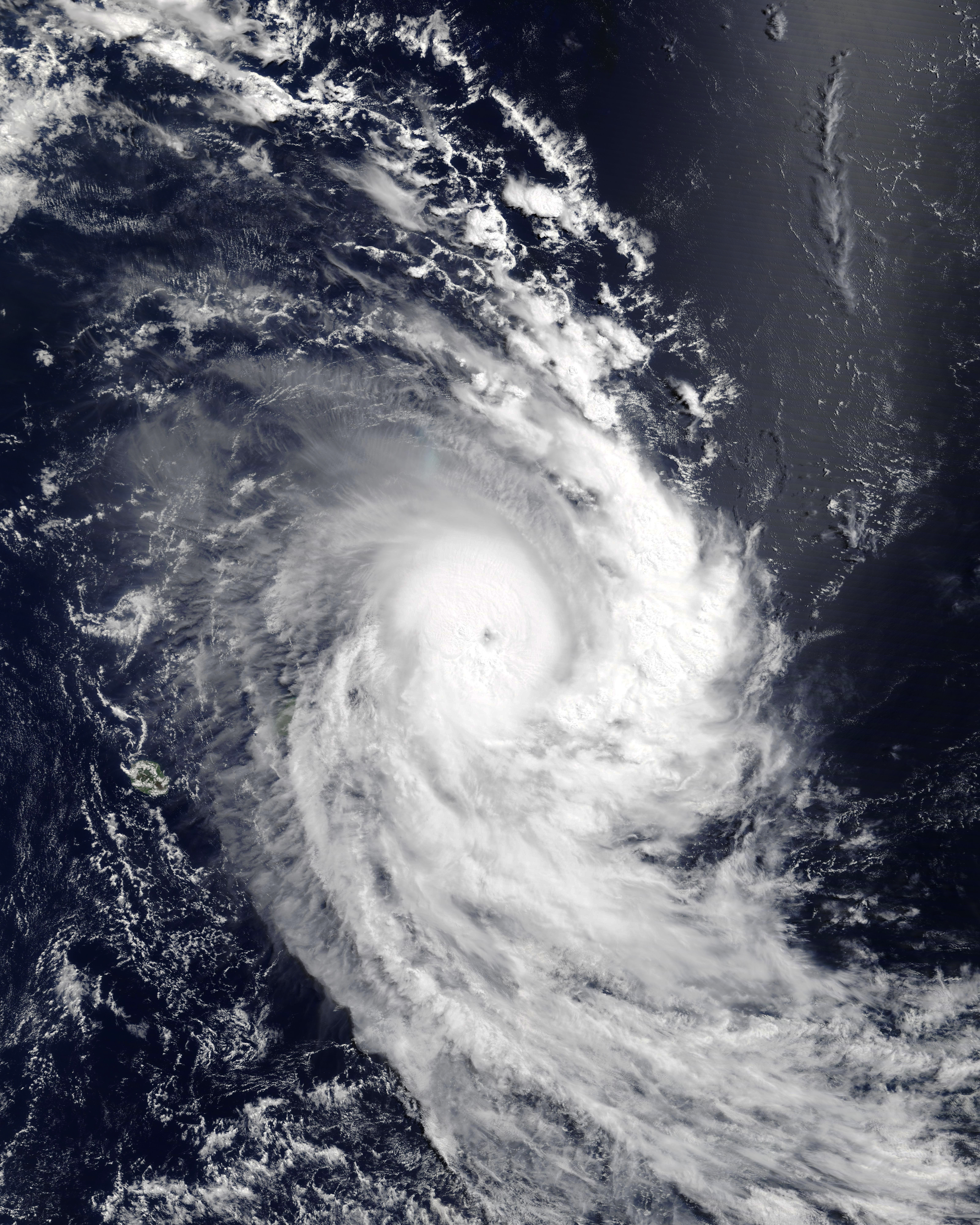
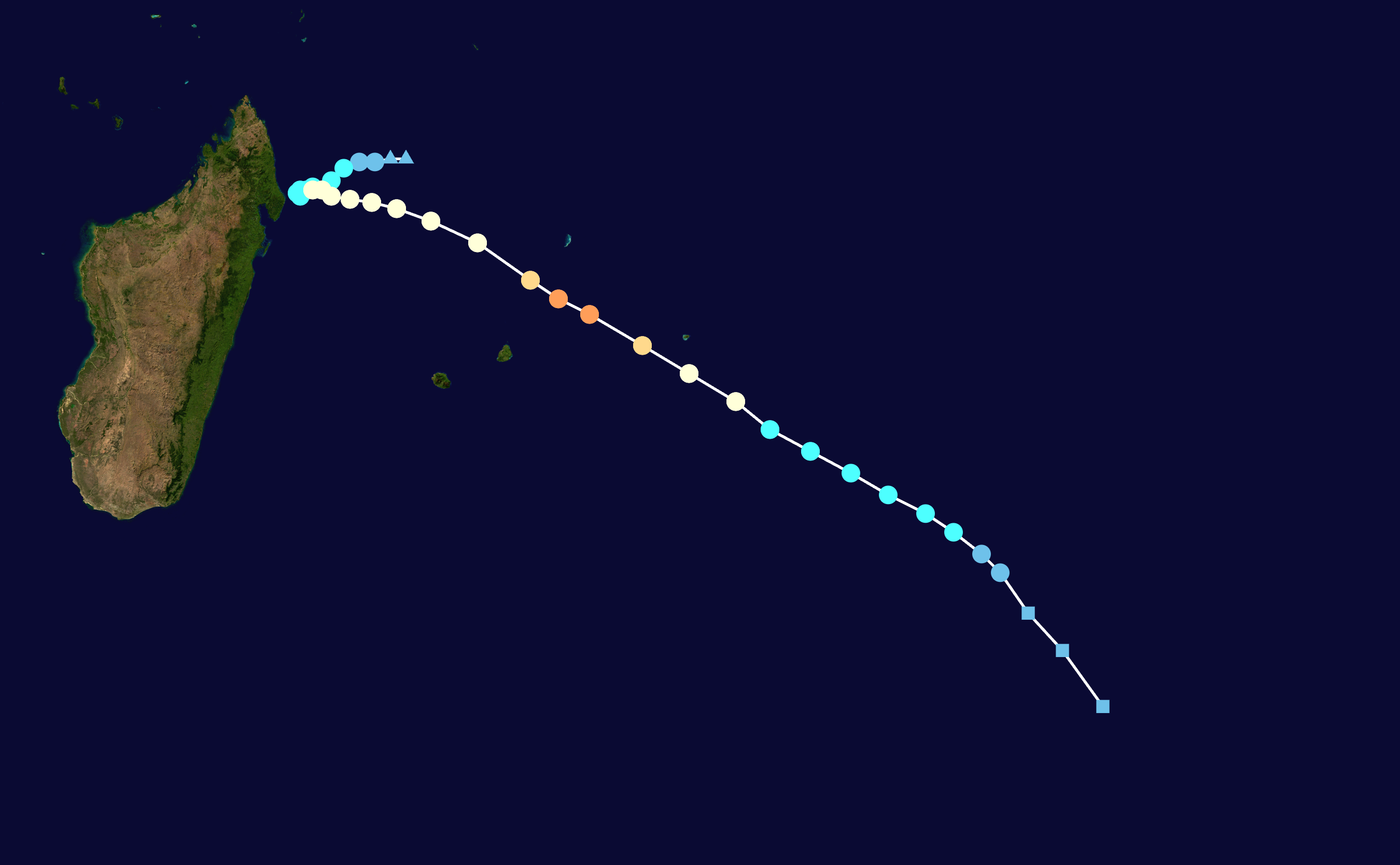
- Duration: 12 March – 20 March
- Peak intensity: 165 km/h (105 mph) (10-min); 955 hPa (mbar)

Towards the beginning of March, a diffuse low-pressure system persisted for several days near Tromelin Island, remaining nearly stationary with an occasional drift towards the north or west. Though conditions were initially favourable, the further development of the system was slowed by its large size. An influx of dry air and strong wind shear muted convective activity around the low-pressure area, eventually leading to its dissipation on 4 March. However, convection unexpectedly reemerged the next day north of the Mascarene Islands. Conditions both conducive and unconducive for tropical cyclone development were present near the embryonic system over the following week. Convective activity increased and decreased diurnally without much persistence. A clearer developmental trend began on 12 March as thunderstorms began to coalesce and persist around a newly formed wind circulation near Tromelin Island; this was designated as Zone of Disturbed Weather 10 by MFR. As convection concentrated further, the system strengthened into a tropical depression and further to a Moderate Tropical Storm on 13 March, receiving the name Herold.

Upon its naming, Herold remained stationary just off the northeastern coast of Madagascar due to its position within a col. Herold gradually intensified in this configuration, developing a large core of strong winds within a favourable environment and later reaching Severe Tropical Storm strength on 14 March. The ocean heat content beneath Herold diminished as the storm remained stationary, resulting in a degradation of the storm's overall convective strength despite the formation of a ragged eye. The weakening of a subtropical ridge over Madagascar imparted an east-southeastward motion on Herold, causing the storm to track over warmer, untapped waters and restrengthen. Accelerating poleward, Herold reached Tropical Cyclone strength on 15 March and briefly attained Intense Tropical Cyclone status on 17 March, peaking with sustained winds of 175 km/h (110 mph). The onset of increasing wind shear and dry air initiated a sustained period of rapid weakening following this peak. Between 17 and 18 March, the weakening storm's centre tracked 220 km (140 mi) east of Mauritius and 175 km (109 mi) southwest of Rodrigues. On 18 March, Herold's winds fell below Tropical Cyclone strength as wind shear pulled the storm's central circulation and convection apart. MFR issued their last advisory on Herold at 12:00 UTC that day. The storm's remnants continued southeastward, maintaining a region of gale-force winds and an occasional pulse of thunderstorms.

Météo Madagascar issued a green alert for the Antalaha District and Analanjirofo on 13 March following Herold's formation; a yellow alert was later raised for Analanjirofo the following day. The storm produced heavy rains in northeastern Madagascar, affecting over 3,000 people. Sambava recorded 95 mm (3.7 in) of rain on 13 March; floods there displaced a hundred people. Rivers near Maroantsetra overflowed and inundated surrounding villages and disrupted traffic, including Andranofotsy in particular. Homes were swept away in Maroantsetra. Floods along the Ankavanana River affected over a thousand people. Overall, flooding impacted 104 schools. Four people were killed in the Sava Region. A class 1 cyclone warning was issued for Mauritius on 15 March, which was upgraded further to a class 2 warning two days later. A class 3 warning was escalated to a class 4 warning for Rodrigues on 18 March. Schools were closed on 17 March on Mauritius and Rodrigues as Herold passed between the islands. Eighty people on Rodrigues sought refuge in eight accommodation centres. The cyclone's effects were ultimately limited to downed trees and power outages in some areas of Rodrigues. A peak gust of 130 km/h (81 mph) was registered at Sir Gaëtan Duval Airport. Herold's distance from the island kept rainfall low, with a maximum of 29 mm (1.1 in) in Patate Théophile.

=== Intense Tropical Cyclone Irondro ===
- Intense tropical cyclone (MFR)
- Category 3 tropical cyclone (SSHWS)
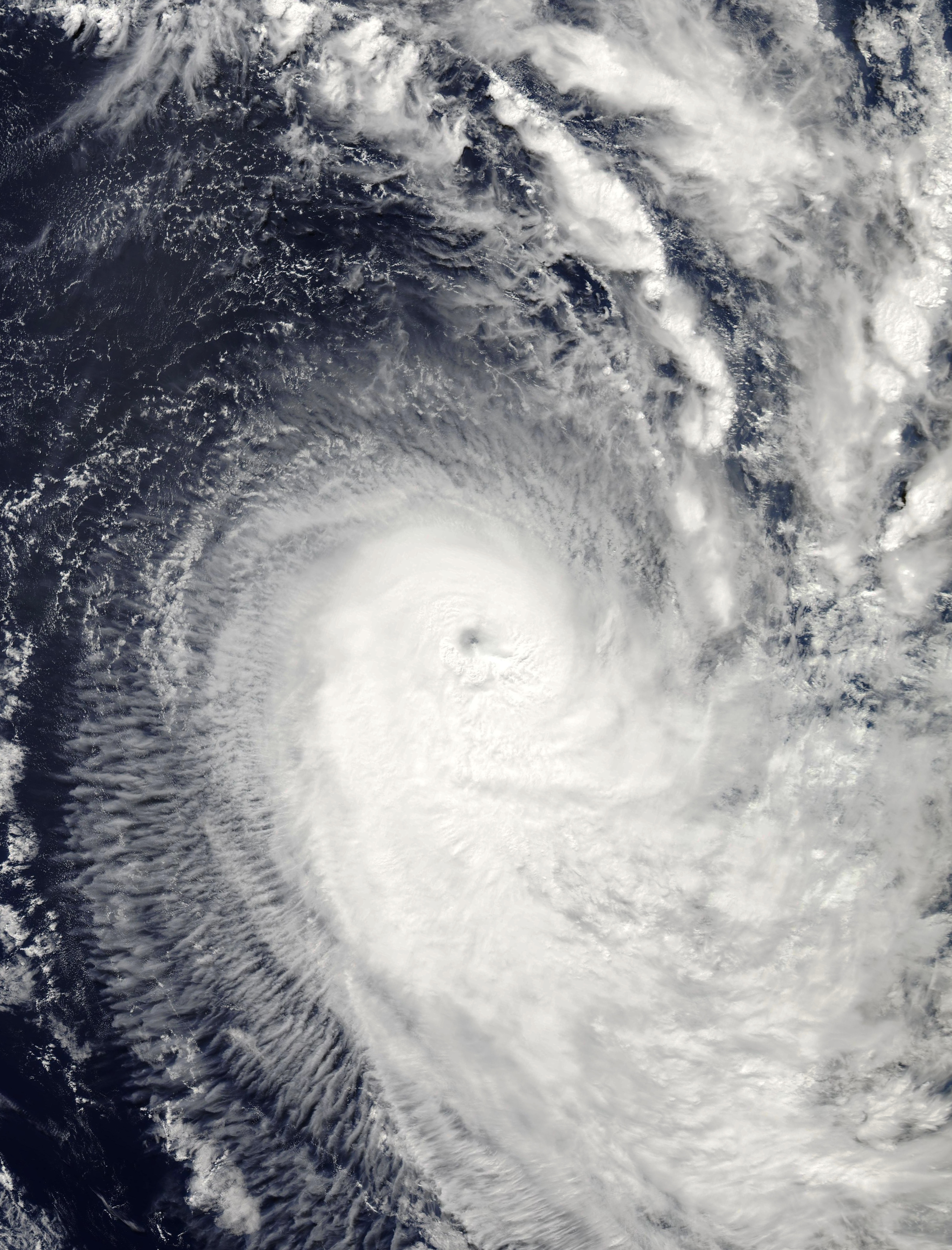
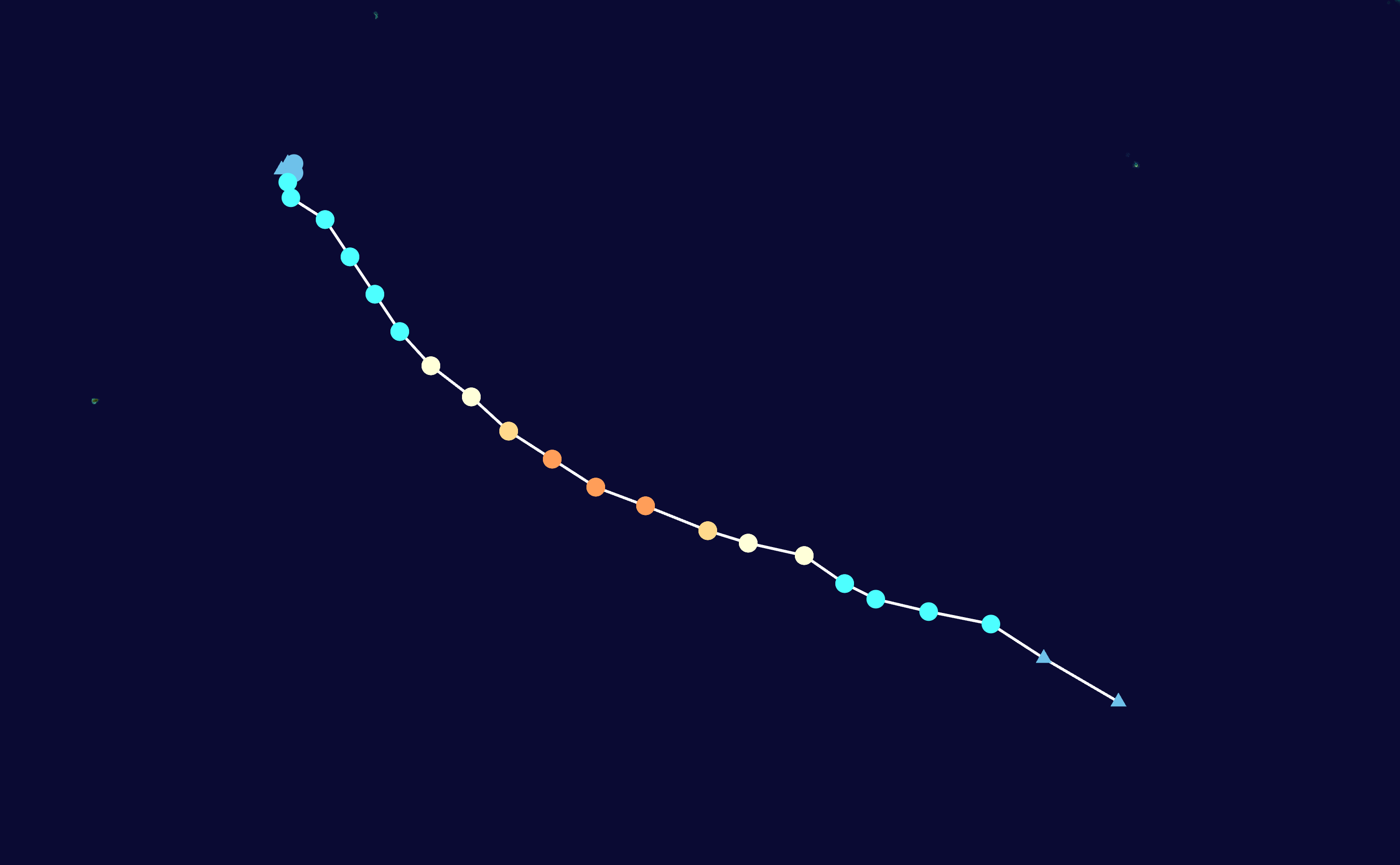
- Duration: 1 April – 6 April (Exited basin)
- Peak intensity: 175 km/h (110 mph) (10-min); 950 hPa (mbar)

On 29 March, monsoonal flow led to the formation of a broad area of low pressure in the central region of the South-West Indian Ocean basin. Showers and thunderstorms began to develop and consolidate in connection with this system south-southwest of Diego Garcia. It was classified by the MFR as a Zone of Disturbed Weather on 31 March and moved slowly during its first two days as an officially designated tropical system. Rainbands took shape around the newly formed center of circulation. Easterly wind shear impinged upon the system during its early stages, but a favorable upper-air environment provided suitable conditions for persistent convection. On 2 April, more favourable conditions for intensification in the wake of a passing equatorial Kelvin wave allowed the storm to a Moderate Tropical Storm; the Mauritius Meteorological Services named it Irondro. Concurrently, the storm began to track towards the southeast in response to a subtropical ridge to its east. Irondro's winds increased throughout the day, particularly following a large burst of thunderstorms around the centre of the storm, reaching Severe Tropical Storm strength by 06:00 UTC on 3 April.

Irondro was upgraded to Tropical Cyclone status at 18:00 UTC on 3 April after developing an intense central dense overcast with some hints of an eye. The development of a pinhole eye and tight rainbands by the end of 3 April indicated rapid intensification was underway. Early on 6 April, Irondro briefly peaked as an Intense Tropical Cyclone with sustained winds of 175 km/h (110 mph). The storm then traversed a region of increasing wind shear, drier air, and diminishing oceanic heat content, precipitating the storm's weakening. The organisation of Irondro's clouds deteriorated throughout 4 April as it was undermined by the steadily increasing wind shear. The next day, the system weakened to a Severe Tropical Storm as the associated convection moved away from the low-level centre of circulation. Its swath of storm-force winds also began to abate along with the fleeting thunderstorm activity. On 6 April, Irondro degenerated into a post-tropical depression and moved into the Australian cyclone region.

=== Moderate Tropical Storm Jeruto ===
- Moderate tropical storm (MFR)
- Tropical storm (SSHWS)
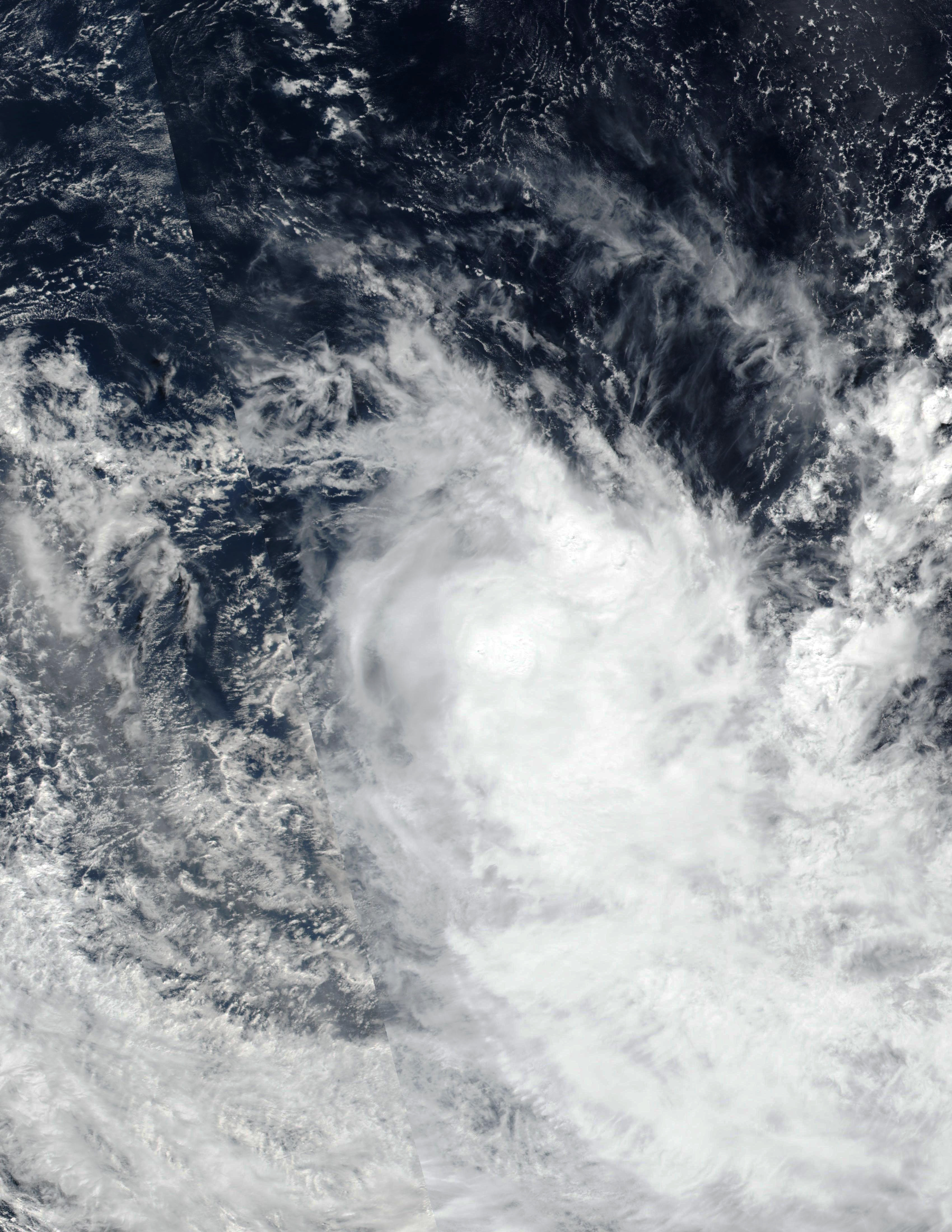
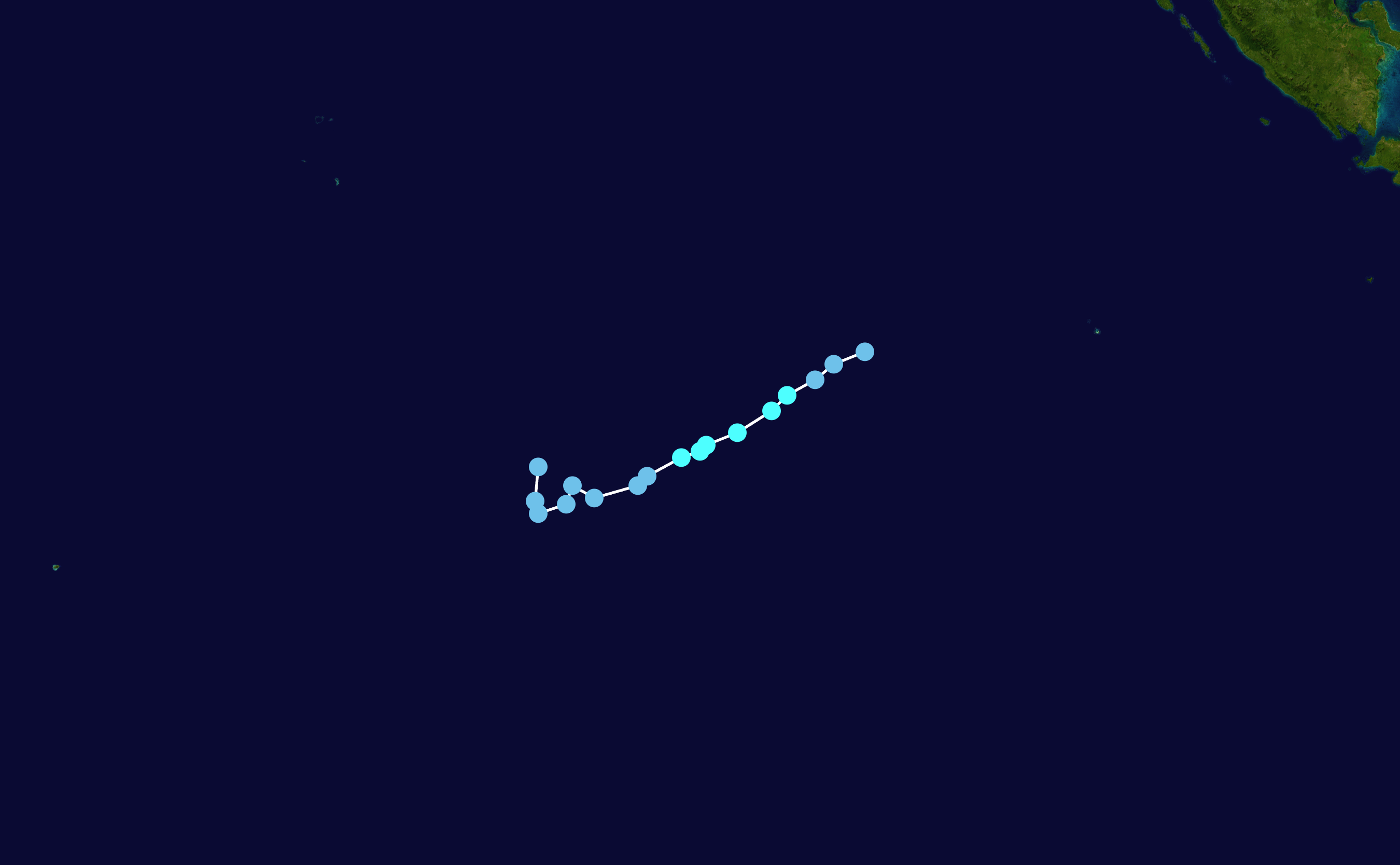
- Duration: 13 April (Entered basin) – 16 April
- Peak intensity: 75 km/h (45 mph) (10-min); 999 hPa (mbar)

Late on 13 April, a developing tropical low crossed over the 90th meridian east from the Australian cyclone region. The environment was generally favourable for tropical cyclogenesis, with warm sea surface temperatures, low vertical wind shear and good poleward upper-level outflow. Microwave satellite imagery indicated that formative convective banding had begun to wrap into the centre of circulation, and the JTWC assessed the probability of the system strengthening into a tropical cyclone as medium. However, MFR reported that there was a lack of substantial convergence from the north in the lower troposphere, which they noted could slow or prevent the development of a strong low-level circulation before environmental conditions became less favourable for strengthening.

The system was classified as Tropical Depression 12 by MFR at 06:00 UTC on 14 April, and the JTWC issued a Tropical Cyclone Formation Alert a few hours later. Convection increased in organisation throughout the night, and the system was classified as Tropical Storm 26S by the JTWC at 18:00 UTC. It was noted that satellite scatterometer data indicated that the Dvorak technique was underestimating the cyclone's wind speeds at the time. On 15 April, the depression was said to have strengthened into a moderate tropical storm as convection successfully wrapped around the low-level circulation, and it was named Jeruto. Offset by high wind shear, Jeruto began to quickly weaken shortly after being designated as a moderate tropical storm, and was downgraded to a tropical depression just 12 hours after being named as convection quickly became displaced south of the center. Just 6 hours after this downgrade, the JTWC issued its final warning as it became highly disorganized. Jeruto was estimated by MFR to have weakened below tropical depression intensity by early on 16 April, and the last advisory by the MFR on Jeruto was issued on 16 April as it rapidly dissipated.

== Storm names ==
Within the South-West Indian Ocean, tropical depressions and subtropical depressions that are judged to have 10-minute sustained wind speeds of 65 km/h (40 mph) by the Regional Specialised Meteorological Centre on La Réunion Island, France (RSMC La Réunion) are usually assigned a name. However, it is the Sub-Regional Tropical Cyclone Advisory Centers in Mauritius and Madagascar who name the systems. The Sub-Regional Tropical Cyclone Advisory Center in Mauritius names a storm should it intensify into a moderate tropical storm between 55°E and 90°E. If instead, a cyclone intensifies into a moderate tropical storm between 30°E and 55°E then the Sub-Regional Tropical Cyclone Advisory Center in Madagascar assigns the appropriate name to the storm. Storm names are taken from three pre-determined lists of names, which rotate on a triennial basis, with any names that have been used automatically removed. Therefore, all storm names used this year will be removed from the rotation and replaced with a new name for the 2022–23 season, while the unused names will remain on the list. New names this season were: Ambali, Belna, Calvinia, Diane, Esami and Francisco. They replaced Abela, Bransby, Carlos, Dineo, Enawo and Fernando after the 2016–17 season.

- Ambali
- Belna
- Calvinia
- Diane
- Esami
- Francisco
- Gabekile
- Herold
- Irondro
- Jeruto
- Kundai (unused)
- Lisebo (unused)
- Michel (unused)
- Nousra (unused)
- Olivier (unused)
- Pokera (unused)
- Quincy (unused)
- Rebaone (unused)
- Salama (unused)
- Tristan (unused)
- Ursula (unused)
- Violet (unused)
- Wilson (unused)
- Xila (unused)
- Yekela (unused)
- Zania (unused)

After the season, the ten names used were automatically retired and were replaced with Ashley, Balita, Cheneso, Dingani, Enala, Fabien, Gezani, Horacio, Indusa and Juluka, respectively for the 2022–23 season.

== Seasonal effects ==
This table lists all of the tropical cyclones and subtropical cyclones that were monitored during the 2019–20 South-West Indian Ocean cyclone season. Information on their intensity, duration, name, areas affected, primarily comes from RSMC La Réunion. Death and damage reports come from either press reports or the relevant national disaster management agency while the damage totals are given in 2019 USD.

Name	Dates	Peak intensity			Areas affected	Damage (USD)	Deaths	Ref(s).
Name	Dates	Category	Wind speed	Pressure	Areas affected	Damage (USD)	Deaths	Ref(s).
One	22 – 25 July	Zone of disturbed weather	35 km/h (25 mph)	1001 hPa (29.56 inHg)	None	None	None	
Belna	2 – 11 December	Tropical cyclone	155 km/h (95 mph)	965 hPa (28.50 inHg)	Seychelles, Mayotte, Comoros, Madagascar	> $25 million	9	
Ambali	3 – 7 December	Very intense tropical cyclone	220 km/h (140 mph)	930 hPa (27.46 inHg)	None	None	None	
Calvinia	27 December – 1 January	Tropical cyclone	120 km/h (75 mph)	970 hPa (28.64 inHg)	Mauritius, Rodrigues	Unknown	None	
05	19 – 23 January	Tropical depression	55 km/h (35 mph)	999 hPa (29.50 inHg)	None	None	None	
Diane	22 – 26 January	Moderate tropical storm	75 km/h (45 mph)	990 hPa (29.23 inHg)	Madagascar, Réunion, Mauritius	Unknown	31	
Esami	23 – 26 January	Moderate tropical storm	85 km/h (50 mph)	990 hPa (29.23 inHg)	Rodrigues	Unknown	Unknown	
Francisco	3 – 15 February	Moderate tropical storm	85 km/h (50 mph)	995 hPa (29.38 inHg)	Madagascar	Unknown	1	
Gabekile	13 – 17 February	Intense tropical cyclone	165 km/h (105 mph)	950 hPa (28.05 inHg)	None	None	None	
Herold	12 – 20 March	Intense tropical cyclone	165 km/h (105 mph)	955 hPa (28.20 inHg)	Madagascar, Tromelin Island	Unknown	5	
Irondro	1 – 6 April	Intense tropical cyclone	175 km/h (110 mph)	950 hPa (28.05 inHg)	None	None	None	
Jeruto	13 – 16 April	Moderate tropical storm	75 km/h (45 mph)	999 hPa (29.50 inHg)	None	None	None	
Season aggregates
12 systems	22 July – 16 April		220 km/h (135 mph)	930 hPa (27.46 inHg)		>$25 million	46	

== See also ==
- Weather of 2019 and 2020
- 2019–20 Australian region cyclone season
- 2019–20 South Pacific cyclone season
- Atlantic hurricane seasons: 2019, 2020
- List of Southern Hemisphere tropical cyclone seasons
- North Indian Ocean cyclone seasons: 2019, 2020
- Pacific hurricane seasons: 2019, 2020
- Pacific typhoon seasons: 2019, 2020
- South-West Indian Ocean tropical cyclone
- Tropical cyclones in 2019 and 2020
