= Pheloticus =

Scientific classification
- Kingdom: Animalia
- Phylum: Arthropoda
- Clade: Pancrustacea
- Class: Insecta
- Order: Coleoptera
- Suborder: Polyphaga
- Infraorder: Cucujiformia
- Family: Chrysomelidae
- Subfamily: Eumolpinae
- Tribe: Typophorini
- Genus: Pheloticus; Harold, 1877

Type species
- Pheloticus dorsalis (= Rhyparida madagascariensis Jacoby, 1877) Harold, 1877

Synonyms
- Neomenius Duvivier, 1891; Navanites Bechyné, 1950

Genus of leaf beetles from Africa

Pheloticus is a genus of leaf beetles in the subfamily Eumolpinae. It is mainly found in Madagascar, with four additional species found on the Mascarene Islands. Many species had been previously placed in the related genus Syagrus by Jan Bechyně.

== Species ==
Species described from Madagascar:

- Pheloticus achardi (Bechyné, 1947)
  - Pheloticus achardi achardi (Bechyné, 1947) – Ikongo
  - Pheloticus achardi boreella (Bechyné, 1951) – Antsiranana
  - Pheloticus achardi sequens (Bechyné, 1951) – Rogez; Antananarivo
  - Pheloticus achardi tabens (Bechyné, 1947) – Mandraka
- Pheloticus affinis Brancsik, 1893 – Nosy Be
- Pheloticus allochromus (Bechyné, 1964) – Antsianaka
- Pheloticus allotrophicus (Bechyné, 1950) – Ambohitsitondrona; Ambodivoangy; Andranofotsy; Androna
- Pheloticus ambrensis (Bechyné, 1964) – Mount Ambohitra
- Pheloticus argopoides (Fairmaire, 1869) – "Madagascar"
- Pheloticus basipennis (Fairmaire, 1902) – Antsiranana; Maevatanana
- Pheloticus bipartitus (Fairmaire, 1886) – Antsiranana
- Pheloticus brunneus Jacoby, 1892 – Analanjirofo; Toamasina; Antsianaka; Mahatsinjo
- Pheloticus castellanus (Bechyné, 1964) – Ambohitsitondrona
- Pheloticus costatipennis (Jacoby, 1877) – "Madagascar"
- Pheloticus distentus (Bechyné, 1946) – Rogez; Betsimisaraka
- Pheloticus diversicornis (Bechyné, 1947) – Maroantsetra District
- Pheloticus femoralis Weise, 1910 – "Madagascar"
- Pheloticus haroldi (Duvivier, 1891) – Analanjirofo; Antsianaka
- Pheloticus hovus (Bechyné, 1951) – Mahatsinjo
- Pheloticus lebisi (Bechyné, 1947) – Ambodivoangy; Antsianaka; Toamasina; Analanjirofo
- Pheloticus lefevrei (Jacoby, 1901) – Antsiranana
- Pheloticus madagascariensis (Jacoby, 1877) – Antsiranana; Antsianaka; Analanjirofo; Fianarantsoa; Antongil Bay; Toamasina; Antananarivo; Maroantsetra; Vohilava
- Pheloticus marlenus (Bechyné, 1964) – Sambirano
- Pheloticus maromandiae (Bechyné, 1946) – Maromandia; Ifanadiana; Fito forest; Mahatsinjo
- Pheloticus nigricollis (Jacoby, 1877) – Mount Ambohitra; Nosy Be
- Pheloticus pallidipennis Jacoby, 1895 – Mahatsinjo; Nosy Boraha; Antsianaka; Analanjirofo
- Pheloticus perroti (Jacoby, 1895) – Antsianaka; Nosy Boraha; Toamasina
- Pheloticus pullatus (Bechyné, 1947) – Sahantaha
- Pheloticus quartus (Bechyné, 1964) – Fort-Dauphin
- Pheloticus quintus (Bechyné, 1964)
  - Pheloticus quintus graciliformis (Bechyné, 1964) – Sambirano
  - Pheloticus quintus imerinensis (Bechyné, 1964) – Andrangoloaka
  - Pheloticus quintus quintus (Bechyné, 1964) – Androna; Mount Ambohitra; Antsiranana; Antsianaka; Analanjirofo; Toamasina; Antananarivo
- Pheloticus recidivus (Bechyné, 1947) – Antsiranana
- Pheloticus rhembastoides (Bechyné, 1947) – "Madagascar"
- Pheloticus rogezianus (Bechyné, 1949)
  - Pheloticus rogezianus rogezianus (Bechyné, 1949) – Rogez; Betsimisaraka; Antakotako
  - Pheloticus rogezianus sambiranensis (Bechyné, 1949) – Sambirano
- Pheloticus rufipennis (Duvivier, 1891) – Sambirano; Antsianaka
- Pheloticus rugicollis (Jacoby, 1897) – Antsiranana
- Pheloticus secundus (Bechyné, 1964) – Antsianaka
- Pheloticus semistriatus Fairmaire, 1886 – Antsianaka; Analanjirofo; Toamasina
- Pheloticus sextus (Bechyné, 1964) – Tanala forest
- Pheloticus strangulatus (Bechyné, 1947) – Antsiranana
  - Pheloticus strangulatus mandrakanus (Bechyné, 1947) – Mandraka; Antananarivo; Analanjirofo
  - Pheloticus strangulatus nandihizinae (Bechyné, 1947) – Nandihizana
  - Pheloticus strangulatus strangulatus (Bechyné, 1947) – Antsiranana
- Pheloticus strigicollis (Fairmaire, 1886) – "Madagascar"
- Pheloticus tertius (Bechyné, 1964) – Androna; Antsianaka
- Pheloticus vadoni (Bechyné, 1946) – Antalaha

Species described from Réunion and Mauritius (but placed in Lymidus by Bechyné (1957)):

- Pheloticus bimaculicollis (Jacoby, 1902) – Mauritius
- Pheloticus dilutus (Lefèvre, 1877) – Mauritius, Réunion, Madagascar (?)
- Pheloticus lateralis (Jacoby, 1898) – Mauritius
- Pheloticus mauritiae (Jacoby, 1898) – Mauritius
