= Ivongius =

Scientific classification
- Kingdom: Animalia
- Phylum: Arthropoda
- Clade: Pancrustacea
- Class: Insecta
- Order: Coleoptera
- Suborder: Polyphaga
- Infraorder: Cucujiformia
- Family: Chrysomelidae
- Subfamily: Eumolpinae
- Tribe: Typophorini
- Genus: Ivongius; Harold, 1877

Genus of leaf beetles from Madagascar

Ivongius is a genus of leaf beetles in the subfamily Eumolpinae. It is found in Madagascar.

== Species ==
- Ivongius aeneicollis (Jacoby, 1892) – "Madagascar"
- Ivongius aeneolus Bechyné, 1947 – Vohemar; Sambirano; Rogez; Mahajanga; Tsarasaotra
- Ivongius altimontanus Bechyné, 1964 – Tsaratanana
- Ivongius andrahomanensis Bechyné, 1964 – Andrahomana
- Ivongius antennarius Harold, 1877 – "Madagascar"
- Ivongius antongilensis Bechyné, 1951 – Antongil Bay; Maroantsetra
- Ivongius apicatus Bechyné, 1949 – Ambodivoangy
- Ivongius basilewskyi Bechyné, 1964 – Toamasina
- Ivongius bifasciatus (Jacoby, 1892) – Vohemar; Mount Ambohitra; Antsiranana; Andrangoloaka
- Ivongius bohumilae Bechyné, 1964 – Tsaratanana
- Ivongius brevilatus Bechyné, 1953 – Vohemar; Ampanefena; Antananarivo
- Ivongius catalai Bechyné, 1964 – Ankarampotsy; Sahambavo
- Ivongius dilaticollis Bechyné, 1947 – Sambirano; Nosy Be
- Ivongius elongatus Bechyné, 1953 – Ambohitsitondrona; Maroantsetra; Andrangoloaka
- Ivongius fortestriatus Bechyné, 1953 – Vohemar
- Ivongius gendreaui Bechyné, 1947 – Ambodivoangy; Nandihizana
- Ivongius inconstans Lefèvre, 1885 – Mahakiry; Ambodivoangy; Sahantaha
- Ivongius interruptus (Fairmaire, 1903) – Antongil Bay
- Ivongius latissimus Bechyné, 1964 – Fort-Dauphin
- Ivongius lefevrei Jacoby, 1897 – Andgangoloaka; Antsiranana; Antananarivo
- Ivongius madagascariensis (Jacoby, 1897) – Fort-Dauphin; Andrahomana; Androy; Mandrare basin
- Ivongius minutus Jacoby, 1897 – Antananarivo; Nosy Be; Tanala forest; Antsiranana; Tsarasaotra
- Ivongius opacicollis Bechyné, 1951 – Ambodivoangy; Ankovana; Sahantaha; Mahakiry; Maroantsetra
- Ivongius parentalis Bechyné, 1964 – Ambodivoangy; Ankovana; Sahantaha; Andranofotsy; Mahakiry; Beanana
- Ivongius pauper Bechyné, 1947 – Mahakiry; Sahantaha; Navana
- Ivongius petulans Bechyné, 1947 – Antananarivo
- Ivongius politus Bechyné, 1964 – Fort-Dauphin
- Ivongius rhembastoides Bechyné, 1964 – Tanala forest; Ankarampotsy
- Ivongius rubidus Weise, 1910 – Andrangaloaka
- Ivongius rudis Bechyné, 1951 – Antakotako
- Ivongius rufinus Harold, 1877 – Mahakiry; Nandihizana; Sahantaha; Beanana; Ambodivoangy; Rantabe; Ihosy; Ankaratra; Analanjirofo; Antananarivo
- Ivongius rufipes Harold, 1877 – Mahatsinjo; Analanjirofo
- Ivongius scissus Bechyné, 1964 – "Madagascar"
- Ivongius semiopacus Bechyné, 1964 – Antsiranana
- Ivongius sericeiceps Bechyné, 1964 – Nosy Be
- Ivongius signatus (Weise, 1910) – Ankarampotsy; Andrangoloaka; Toamasina; Mahatsinjo; Tanala forest
- Ivongius suarezius Bechyné, 1964 – Antsiranana
- Ivongius subdeletus (Weise, 1914) – Nosy Boraha; Antsianaka; Fito forest; Sahambava; Analanjirofo; Toamasina; Antananarivo
- Ivongius subrectus Bechyné, 1947 – Ambodivoangy; Ambodimagna
- Ivongius sulcatus Bechyné, 1964 – Antsingy; Lambomakandra
- Ivongius terminatus Weise, 1910 – "Madagascar"
- Ivongius thoracicus Bechyné, 1964 – south coast forest
- Ivongius versatilis Bechyné, 1947
  - Ivongius versatilis mansus Bechyné, 1947 – Navana; Mahakiry; Ambodivoangy; Maroantsetra; Sahantaha; Ankovana; Andrangaloaka
  - Ivongius versatilis versatilis Bechyné, 1947 – Sambirano
- Ivongius vetulus Bechyné, 1947 – Sahantaha; Antakotako; Mahakiry; Navana; Ambodivoangy; Ankovana; Maroantsetra
- Ivongius violaceipennis Bechyné, 1964 – Antalaha
- Ivongius weisei Achard, 1914 – Androy
