= Ankofa =

- Location in Madagascar
- Coordinates: 15°24′S 49°39′E
- Country: Madagascar
- Region: Ambatosoa
- District: Maroantsetra
- Elevation: 22 m (72 ft)

Population (2001)
  - Total: 18,000
- Time zone: UTC+3 (EAT)
- Postal code: 512

Ankofa is a rural municipality in Ambatosoa, Madagascar. It belongs to the district of Maroantsetra. The population of the commune was estimated to be approximately 18,000 in the 2001 commune census.

Only primary schooling is available. The majority 95% of the population of the commune are farmers. The most important crops are rice and vanilla; also cloves are an important agricultural product. Services provide employment for 5% of the population.

== Waterways ==
Ankofa lies at the Antainambalana River, a little upstream from Maroantsetra.
