= Ambinanitelo =

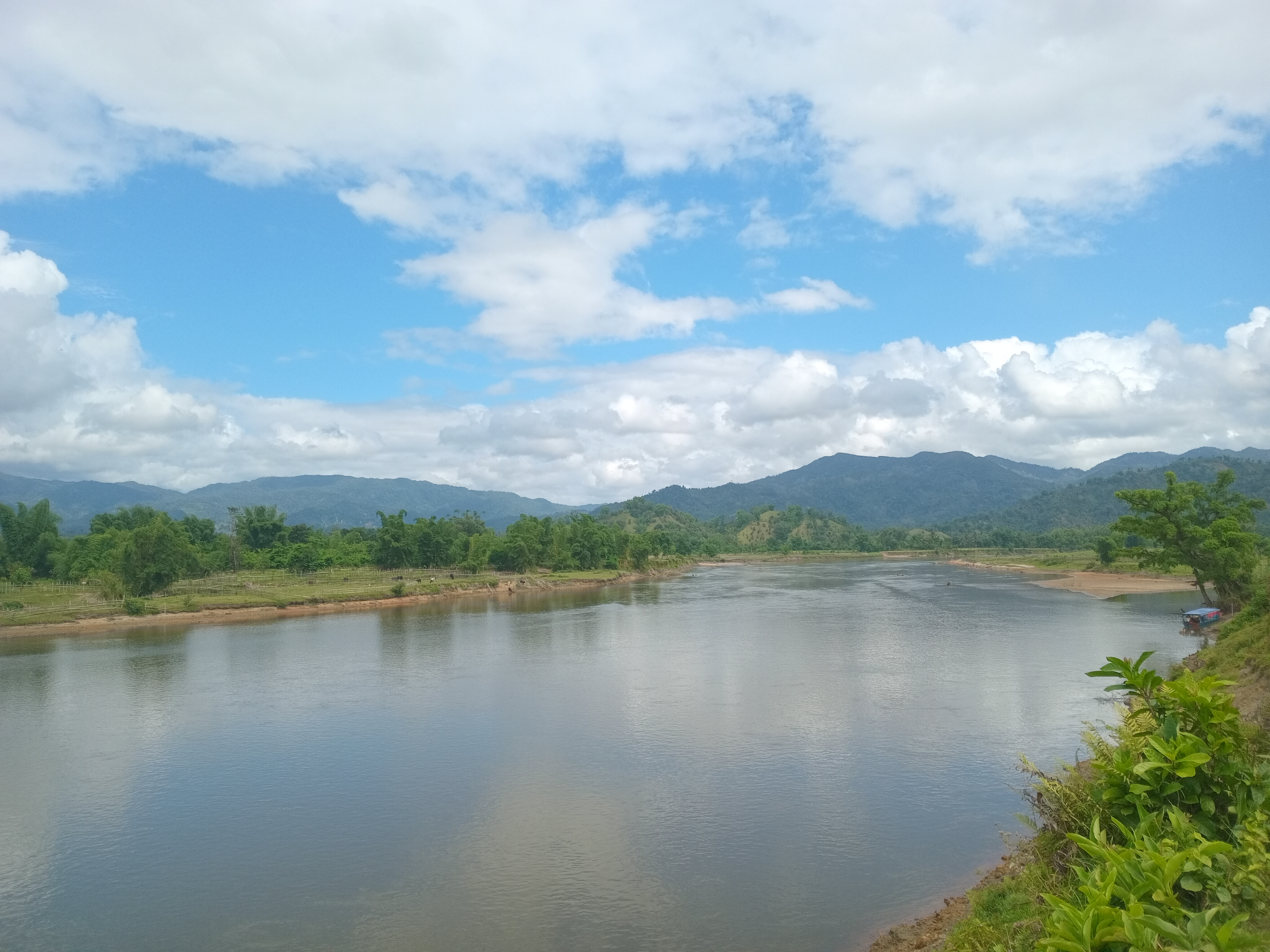

- Location in Madagascar
- Coordinates: 15°21′S 49°35′E
- Country: Madagascar
- Region: Ambatosoa
- District: Maroantsetra
- Elevation: 39 m (128 ft)

Population (2001)
  - Total: 30,000
- Time zone: UTC+3 (EAT)
- Postal code: 512
- Köppen: Af

Ambinanitelo is a rural municipality in Ambatosoa, Madagascar. It belongs to the district of Maroantsetra. The population of the municipality was estimated to be approximately 30,000 in the 2001 commune census.

Primary and junior level secondary education are available in town. The majority 95% of the population of the commune are farmers. The most important crops are rice and cloves, while other important agricultural products are coffee and vanilla. Services provide employment for 5% of the population.

The Polish writer and adventurer Arkady Fiedler visited Ambinanitelo in 1937 and resided there for several months, which was the subject of a travel book he wrote on his return to Poland giving a detailed account of the townspeople's daily life and culture, as well as some frictions with the French colonial authorities which he witnessed. This made the name of Ambinanitelo familiar to several generations of Polish readers, and the book was also translated to several other languages.

== Waterways ==
Ambinanitelo lies at the Antainambalana River, a little upstream from Maroantsetra.
