= Antsirabe (disambiguation) =

Antsirabe is the name of several places in Madagascar:

- Antsirabe, a large city and urban district, the capital of Vakinankaratra.
- Antsirabe I District, the urban district where the city of Antsirabe is located.
- Antsirabe II District, a rural district surrounding the city of Antsirabe.
- Antsirabe, Ambanja, a town and commune in Ambanja District, Diana.
- Antsirabe Nord (Antsirabe Avaratra), a town and commune in Vohemar District, Sava.
- Antsirabe Nord or Antsirabe Avaratra, neighbourhood of Antsirabe city, Vakinankaratra.
- Antsirabe Afovoany, a town and commune in Mandritsara District, Sofia.
- Antsirabe Sahatany, a town and commune in Maroantsetra District, Ambatosoa.
