= Rantabe =

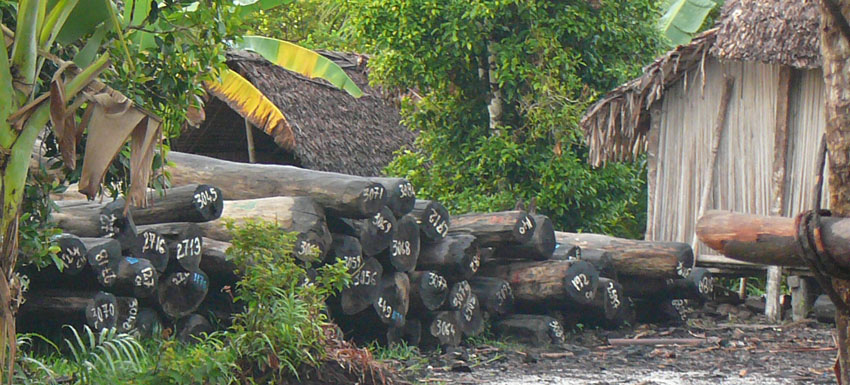
- Rosewood lodges at Rantabe waterline

- Location in Madagascar
- Coordinates: 15°42′S 49°39′E
- Country: Madagascar
- Region: Ambatosoa
- District: Maroantsetra
- Elevation: 17 m (56 ft)

Population (2001)
  - Total: 20,000
- Time zone: UTC+3 (EAT)
- Postal code: 512

Rantabe is a rural commune in Ambatosoa, Madagascar. It belongs to the district of Maroantsetra. The population of the commune was estimated to be approximately 20,000 in the 2001 commune census.

Rantabe has a riverine harbour. Primary and junior level secondary education are available in town. The majority 82% of the population of the commune are farmers. The most important crops are rice and vanilla, while other important agricultural products are coffee and cloves. Services provide employment for 12% of the population. Additionally fishing employs 6% of the population.

== Roads ==
The town is situated at the N5 road, south of the mouth of the Rantabe River into the Indian Ocean.

== Nature ==
- Makira Natural Park

== See also ==
- James Plaintain - a pirate that settled in Rantabe.
