= Anandrivola =

- Location in Madagascar
- Coordinates: 15°49′S 49°41′E
- Country: Madagascar
- Region: Ambatosoa
- District: Maroantsetra
- Elevation: 22 m (72 ft)

Population (2018)
  - Total: 8,495
- Time zone: UTC+3 (EAT)
- Postal code: 512

Anandrivola is a rural commune in Ambatosoa, Madagascar. It belongs to the district of Maroantsetra. The population of the commune was estimated to be approximately 8,495 in 2018.

Only primary schooling is available. The majority 95% of the population of the commune are farmers. The most important crops are rice and vanilla; also cloves are an important agricultural product. Services provide employment for 5% of the population.>

The commune is situated at the Anandrivola river and on the Route nationale 5 at 339 km from Toamasina.
