= Sahasindro =

Coordinates: 15°23′S 49°41′E

- Location in Madagascar
- Country: Madagascar
- Region: Ambatosoa
- District: Maroantsetra

Population (2018)
  - Total: 6,214
- Time zone: UTC+3 (EAT)
- Postal code: 512

Sahasindro is a rural commune in Ambatosoa, Madagascar. It belongs to the district of Maroantsetra. The population of the commune was estimated to be approximately 6,214 in 2018.

Primary and junior level secondary education are available in town. The majority 95% of the population of the commune are farmers. The most important crops are rice and vanilla, while other important agricultural products are coffee and cloves. Services provide employment for 5% of the population.

The commune was only founded in 2015 when it was split off from Maroantsetra.
