= Ambanizana =

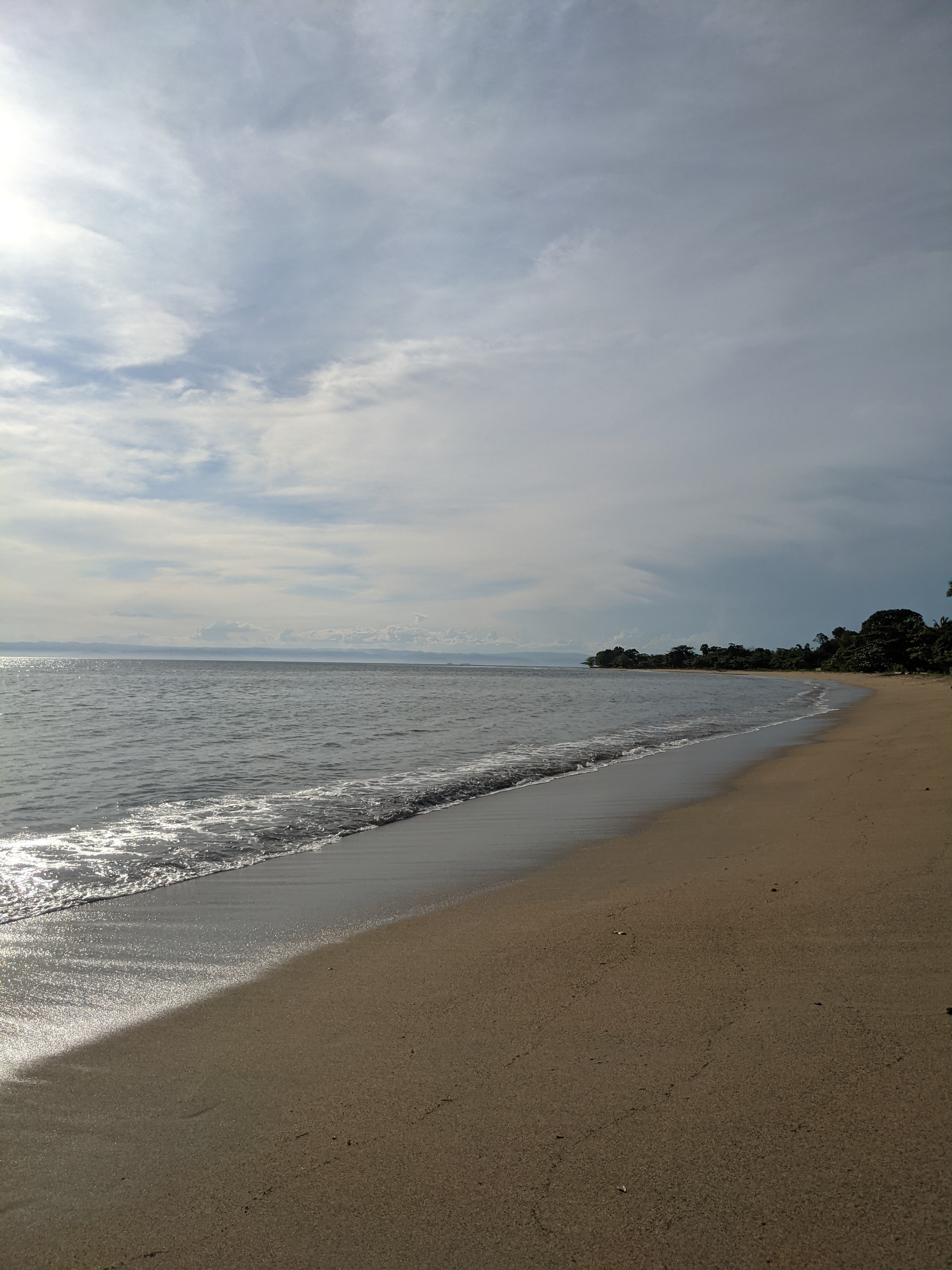
- Ambanizana (beach)

- Location in Madagascar
- Coordinates: 15°37′S 49°58′E
- Country: Madagascar
- Region: Ambatosoa
- District: Maroantsetra
- Elevation: 12 m (39 ft)

Population (2018)
  - Total: 5,265
- Time zone: UTC+3 (EAT)
- Köppen: Af

Ambanizana is a town and commune (Malagasy: kaominina) in Ambatosoa, Madagascar. It belongs to the district of Maroantsetra. The population of the commune was estimated to be approximately 5,265 in 2018.

The village lies at the footpath leading around the Masoala peninsula and the footsteps to the Masoala National Park.
