= Voloina =

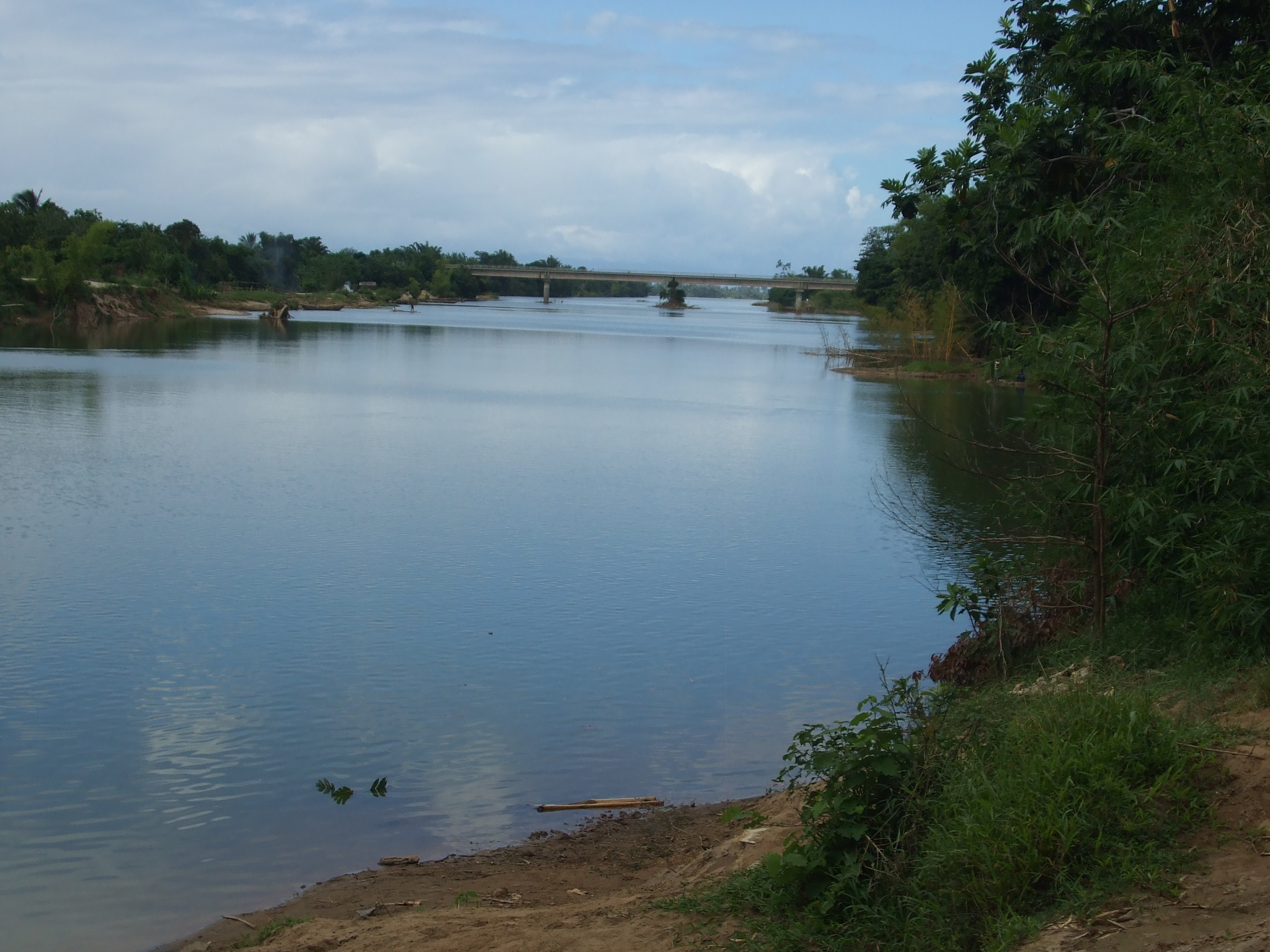
- The Ivoloina river at Voloina

- Location in Madagascar
- Coordinates: 15°34′S 49°37′E
- Country: Madagascar
- Region: Ambatosoa
- District: Maroantsetra
- Elevation: 9 m (30 ft)

Population (2001)
  - Total: 11,000
- Time zone: UTC+3 (EAT)
- Postal code: 512

Voloina is a rural municipality in Ambatosoa, Madagascar. It belongs to the district of Maroantsetra. The population of the commune was estimated to be approximately 11,000 in the 2001 commune census.

Primary and junior level secondary education are available in town. The majority 95% of the population of the commune are farmers. The most important crop is cloves, while other important products are coffee, rice and vanilla. Services provide employment for 3% of the population. Additionally fishing employs 2% of the population.

== Geography ==
Voloina is situated at the Ivoloina River, on the East coast of Madagascar, near its mouth into the Indian Ocean.

== Infrastructure ==
This municipality was connected to the electric grid of Madagascar in 2023.

=== Roads ===
Voloina is situated on the unpaved National Road 5.
