= Mariarano, Maroantsetra =

Mariarano Mariharano
- Location in Madagascar
- Coordinates: 15°21′0″S 49°39′0″E
- Country: Madagascar
- Region: Ambatosoa
- District: Maroantsetra

Population (2018)
  - Total: 7,218
- Time zone: UTC+3 (EAT)
- Postal code: 512

Mariarano is a rural commune in Ambatosoa, Madagascar. It belongs to the district of Maroantsetra. The population of the commune was estimated to be approximately 7,218 in 2018.

Primary and junior level secondary education are available in town. The majority 95% of the population of the commune are farmers. The most important crops are rice and vanilla, while other important agricultural products are coffee and cloves. Services provide employment for 5% of the population.

This commune is situated at the Mariarano River and the Antainambalana River.
