= Antsahana =

Coordinates: 18°15′05″S 47°32′03″E

- Interactive map of Antsahana
- Country: Madagascar
- Region: Ambatosoa
- District: Maroantsetra
- Time zone: UTC+3 (EAT)

Antsahana is a town and commune (Malagasy: kaominina) in Ambatosoa, Madagascar. It belongs to the district of Maroantsetra.

Primary and junior level secondary education are available in town. The majority 85% of the population of the commune are farmers. The most important crops are rice and vanilla, while other important agricultural products are coffee and cloves. Services provide employment for 10% of the population. Additionally fishing employs 5% of the population.
