= Morafeno, Maroantsetra =

Morafeno
- Location in Madagascar
- Coordinates: 15°46′S 49°26′E
- Country: Madagascar
- Region: Ambatosoa
- District: Maroantsetra

Area
  - Total: 18 km^{2} (6.9 sq mi)
- Elevation: 170 m (560 ft)

Population (2018)
  - Total: 5,699
- Time zone: UTC+3 (EAT)

Morafeno is a town and commune (Malagasy: kaominina) in Ambatosoa, Madagascar. It belongs to the district of Maroantsetra. The population of the commune was estimated to be approximately 5,699 in 2018.
