= Malgachinsula maisongrossalis =

Scientific classification
- Kingdom: Animalia
- Phylum: Arthropoda
- Class: Insecta
- Order: Lepidoptera
- Family: Pyralidae
- Genus: Malgachinsula
- Species: M. maisongrossalis

Binomial name
- Malgachinsula maisongrossalis (Viette, 1953)

Synonyms
- Makela maisongrossalis Viette, 1953

Species of moth

Malgachinsula maisongrossalis is a species of snout moth in the genus Malgachinsula. It was described by Viette in 1953, and is known from Madagascar (including Maroantsetra, the type location).
