= Manambolo =

- Location in Madagascar
- Coordinates: 15°17′S 49°42′E
- Country: Madagascar
- Region: Ambatosoa
- District: Maroantsetra
- Elevation: 73 m (240 ft)

Population (2001)
  - Total: 13,000
- Time zone: UTC+3 (EAT)

For the river with the same name, see Manambolo (disambiguation)

Manambolo is a town and commune (Malagasy: kaominina) in Ambatosoa, Madagascar. It belongs to the district of Maroantsetra. The population of the commune was estimated to be approximately 13,000 in the 2001 commune census.

Primary and junior level secondary education are available in town. The majority 95% of the population of the commune are farmers. The most important crops are rice and vanilla, while other important agricultural products are coffee and cloves. Services provide employment for 5% of the population.
