= Anjanazana =

- Location in Madagascar
- Coordinates: 15°23′S 49°45′E
- Country: Madagascar
- Region: Ambatosoa
- District: Maroantsetra
- Elevation: 7 m (23 ft)

Population (2001)
  - Total: 12,000
- Time zone: UTC+3 (EAT)

Anjanazana is a town and commune (Malagasy: kaominina) in Ambatosoa, Madagascar. It belongs to the district of Maroantsetra. The population of the commune was estimated to be approximately 12,000 in the 2001 commune census.

Only primary schooling is available. The majority 95% of the population of the commune are farmers. The most important crops are rice and cloves; also vanilla is an important agricultural product. Services provide employment for 5% of the population.
