= Ambodimanga Rantabe =

- Location in Madagascar
- Coordinates: 15°29′S 49°55′E
- Country: Madagascar
- Region: Ambatosoa
- District: Maroantsetra

Area
  - Total: 200 km^{2} (77 sq mi)
- Elevation: 170 m (560 ft)

Population (2018)
  - Total: 8,326
- Time zone: UTC+3 (EAT)

Ambodimanga Rantabe is a town and commune (Malagasy: kaominina) in Ambatosoa, Madagascar. It belongs to the district of Maroantsetra. The population of the commune was estimated to be approximately 8,326 in 2018.
