= Maroantsetra District =

Maroantsetra (district)
- Commune and town
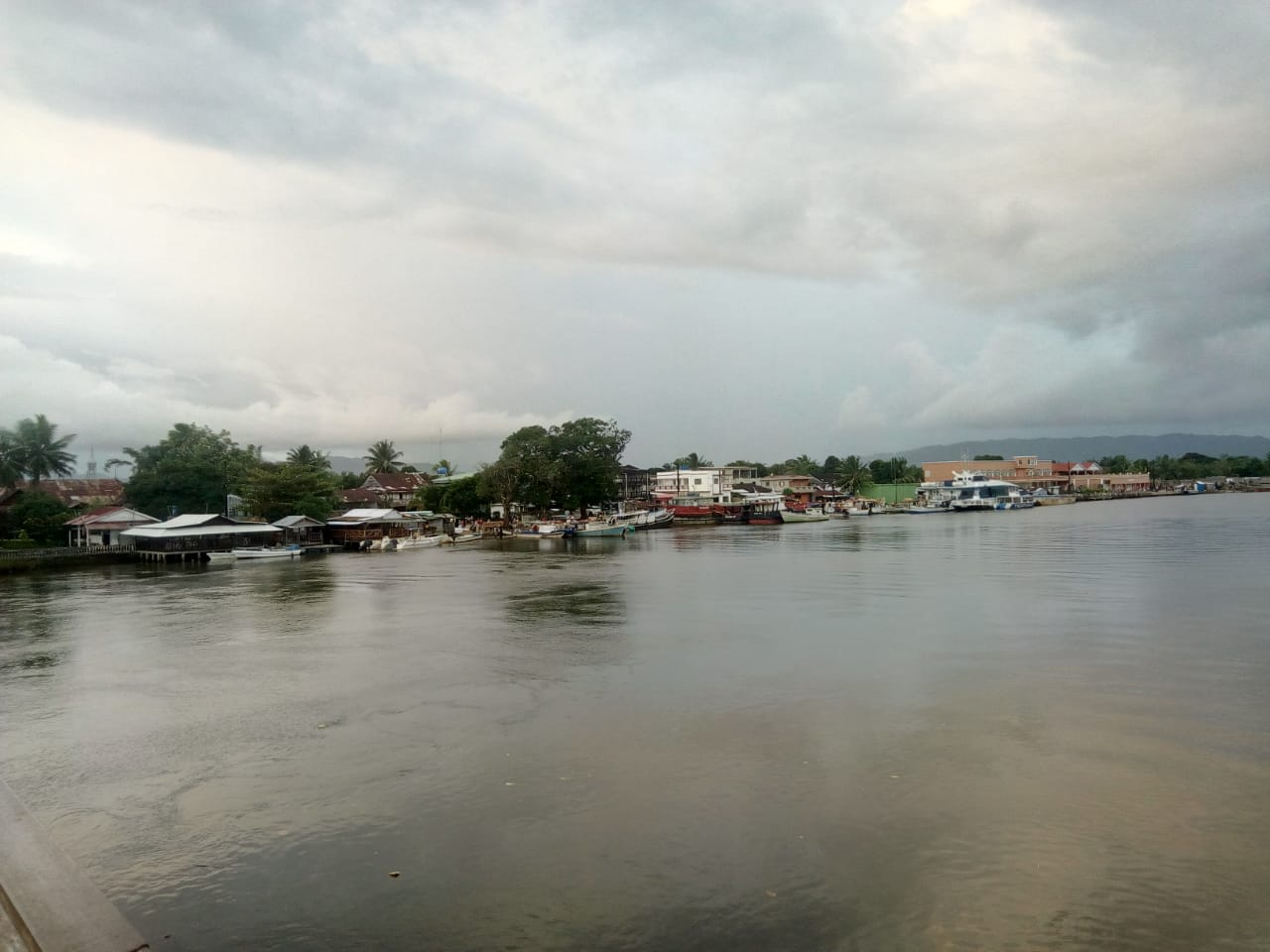
- Port of Maroantsetra

- Location in Madagascar
- Coordinates: 15°26′0″S 49°45′0″E
- Country: Madagascar
- Region: Ambatosoa
- District: Maroantsetra

Area
  - Total: 6,965 km^{2} (2,689 sq mi)
- Elevation: 14 m (46 ft)

Population (2020)
  - Total: 264,234
- Time zone: UTC3 (EAT)
- Postal code: 512

Maroantsetra is a district of Ambatosoa in Madagascar. It hosts part of Masoala National Park and part of Makira Natural Park. The district has an area of 6,965 km^{2} (2,689 sq mi), and the estimated population in 2020 was 264,234.

== Communes ==
The district is further divided into 20 communes:

- Ambanizana
- Ambinanitelo
- Ambodimanga Rantabe
- Anandrivola
- Andranofotsy
- Androndrono
- Anjanazana
- Ankofa
- Ankofabe
- Antakotako
- Antsahana
- Antsirabe Sahatany
- Mahavelona
- Manambolo
- Mariharano
- Maroantsetra
- Morafeno
- Rantabe
- Sahasindro
- Voloina

== Rivers ==
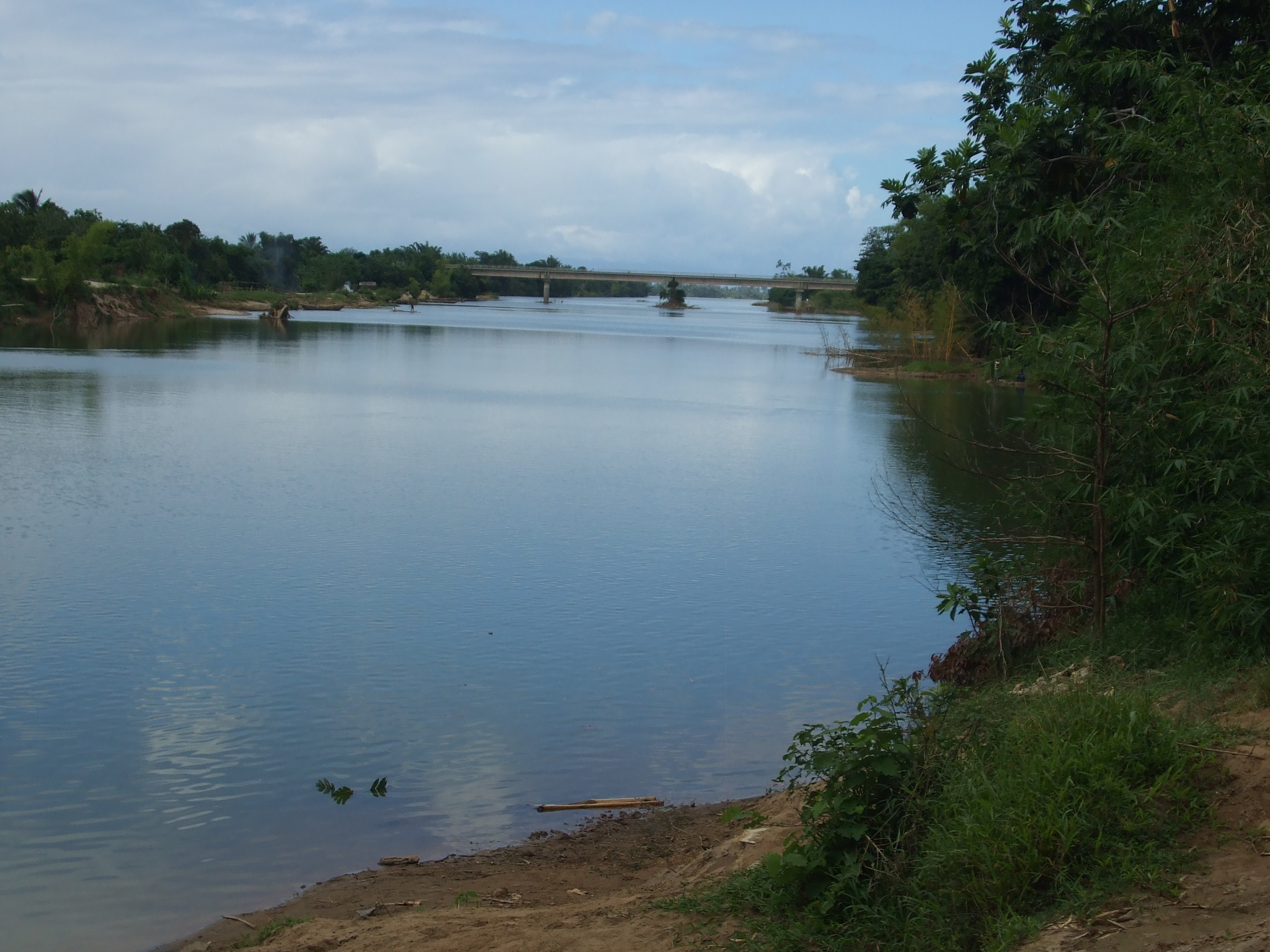
The Ivoloina River at Voloina

This district is crossed by the Rantabe river, Ivoloina River, Antainambalana River, Manambolo (Est), Amaranofotsy, Mahavelona River and the Ambanizana.
