= Begonia bogneri =

Scientific classification
- Kingdom: Plantae
- Clade: Tracheophytes
- Clade: Angiosperms
- Clade: Eudicots
- Clade: Rosids
- Order: Cucurbitales
- Family: Begoniaceae
- Genus: Begonia
- Species: B. bogneri

Binomial name
- Begonia bogneri Ziesenh.

Species of flowering plant

Begonia bogneri is a species of flowering plant in the family Begoniaceae, native to a single 1 ha (2.5 acres) locality on the Masoala Peninsula of Madagascar. Josef Bogner first discovered the species on January 23, 1969 in the Hiarka area, at an elevation of 50 meters (165').

Uniquely among begonias, it has linear, grass-like leaves. It does well in terrariums.

Begonia bogneri was known as Bogner 262 until Rudolf Christian Ziesenhenne formally named the species in 1973.
