= Manambolo (disambiguation) =

Manambolo is a rural municipality in Analanjirofo, Madagascar.

Manambolo may also refer to:

- Manambolo River, river in North-Western Madagascar

== See also ==
- Manambolosy
