= Nosy Mangabe =

Island in Madagascar

Nosy Mangabe National Park
- IUCN category II (national park)
- Location within Madagascar
- Location: Ambatosoa, Madagascar
- Nearest city: Maroantsetra
- Coordinates: 15°30′S 49°46′E
- Area: 90.47 km^{2} (34.93 sq mi)
- Established: 1965
- Visitors: approx. 3000 (in 2005)
- Governing body: Madagascar National Parks Association (ANGAP) in partnership with the Wildlife Conservation Society

Nosy Mangabe is a small island reserve located in Antongil Bay about 2 km (1.2 mi) offshore from the town of Maroantsetra in north-east Madagascar. it is accessible by small boat and is part of the larger Masoala National Park complex. It is a tropical rainforest national park for a species of lemur, the aye-aye (Daubentonia madagascariensis). It lies close enough to Maroantsetra for a day trip, although an overnight stay is recommended for seeing the nocturnal aye-aye.

== History ==
The island has a rich history of trading and piracy and on the west side of the island are rock carvings by Dutch sailors from the 16th century. In the 17th century the area was invaded by the French who established a trading post. British science fiction writer Douglas Adams visited the island searching for the aye-aye, for a radio programme and in one of his lesser known books, Last Chance to See.

== Geography ==
Nosy Mangabe is a 520 hectares (1,300 acres) island national park in Antongil Bay in the north-east of Madagascar. The island is covered in dense forest, has an altitude of 1,331 metres (4,367 ft) and the annual rainfall is 4,000 millimetres (160 in). There are no permanent settlements on the island; a campsite with bathroom and kitchen facilities serves as a base camp for biologists, researchers and eco-tourists. The best way to see the island is by boat from Maroantsetra, which takes about 45 minutes.

== Flora and fauna ==
The island is covered in dense humid forest and was established as a reserve for the aye-aye which were introduced to the island in the 1960s. They were in danger of extinction, having been hunted, for centuries, by local people who consider them to be a symbol of death and harbinger of evil. They are categorised as endangered by the International Union for Conservation of Nature (IUCN). There are a further four species of lemur on the island; the eastern woolly lemur (Avahi laniger), white-fronted lemur (Eulemur albifrons), black-and-white ruffed lemur (Varecia variegata) and gray mouse-lemur (Microcebus murinus).

Baron’s climbing rosewood (Dalbergia baronii) is a vulnerable tree found on the island.

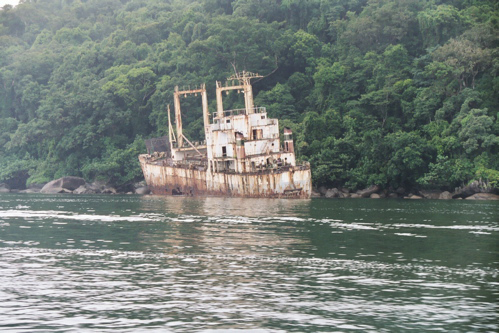
Shipwreck on the west shore

== See also ==
- List of islands of Madagascar
