= Malgachinsula viettei =

Scientific classification
- Kingdom: Animalia
- Phylum: Arthropoda
- Clade: Pancrustacea
- Class: Insecta
- Order: Lepidoptera
- Family: Pyralidae
- Genus: Malgachinsula
- Species: M. viettei

Binomial name
- Malgachinsula viettei Roesler, 1981

Species of moth

Malgachinsula viettei is a species of snout moth in the genus Malgachinsula. It was described by R. Ulrich Roesler in 1981. It is found in Madagascar.
