= Malgachinsula =

Scientific classification
- Domain: Eukaryota
- Kingdom: Animalia
- Phylum: Arthropoda
- Class: Insecta
- Order: Lepidoptera
- Family: Pyralidae
- Subfamily: Phycitinae
- Genus: Malgachinsula; Roesler, 1982

Genus of moths

Malgachinsula is a genus of snout moths described by Rolf-Ulrich Roesler in 1982.

== Species ==
- Malgachinsula anosibeella Roesler, 1982
- Malgachinsula maisongrossalis (Viette, 1953)
- Malgachinsula tsarafidyella Roesler, 1982
- Malgachinsula viettei Roesler, 1982
