= Antsirabe Sahatany =

- Location in Madagascar
- Coordinates: 15°24′S 49°21′E
- Country: Madagascar
- Region: Ambatosoa
- District: Maroantsetra
- Elevation: 1,064 m (3,491 ft)

Population (2001)
  - Total: 11,000
- Time zone: UTC+3 (EAT)

Antsirabe Sahatany is a town and commune (Malagasy: kaominina) in Ambatosoa, Madagascar. It belongs to the district of Maroantsetra. The population of the commune was estimated to be approximately 11,000 in the 2001 commune census.

Only primary schooling is available. The majority 93% of the population of the commune are farmers. The most important crops are rice and cloves, while other important agricultural products are coffee and vanilla. Services provide employment for 5% of the population. Additionally fishing employs 2% of the population.
