= Makira Natural Park =

Protected area in northeastern Madagascar

- Makira Protected Area
- IUCN category II (national park)
- Location within Madagascar
- Location: Analanjirofo, Sava and Sofia, Madagascar
- Nearest city: Maroantsetra, Antalaha, Mandritsara
- Coordinates: 15.413°S 49.538°E
- Area: 372,470 ha (1,438.1 sq mi)
- Established: 19 June 2012
- Governing body: Government of Madagascar; delegated management by the Wildlife Conservation Society

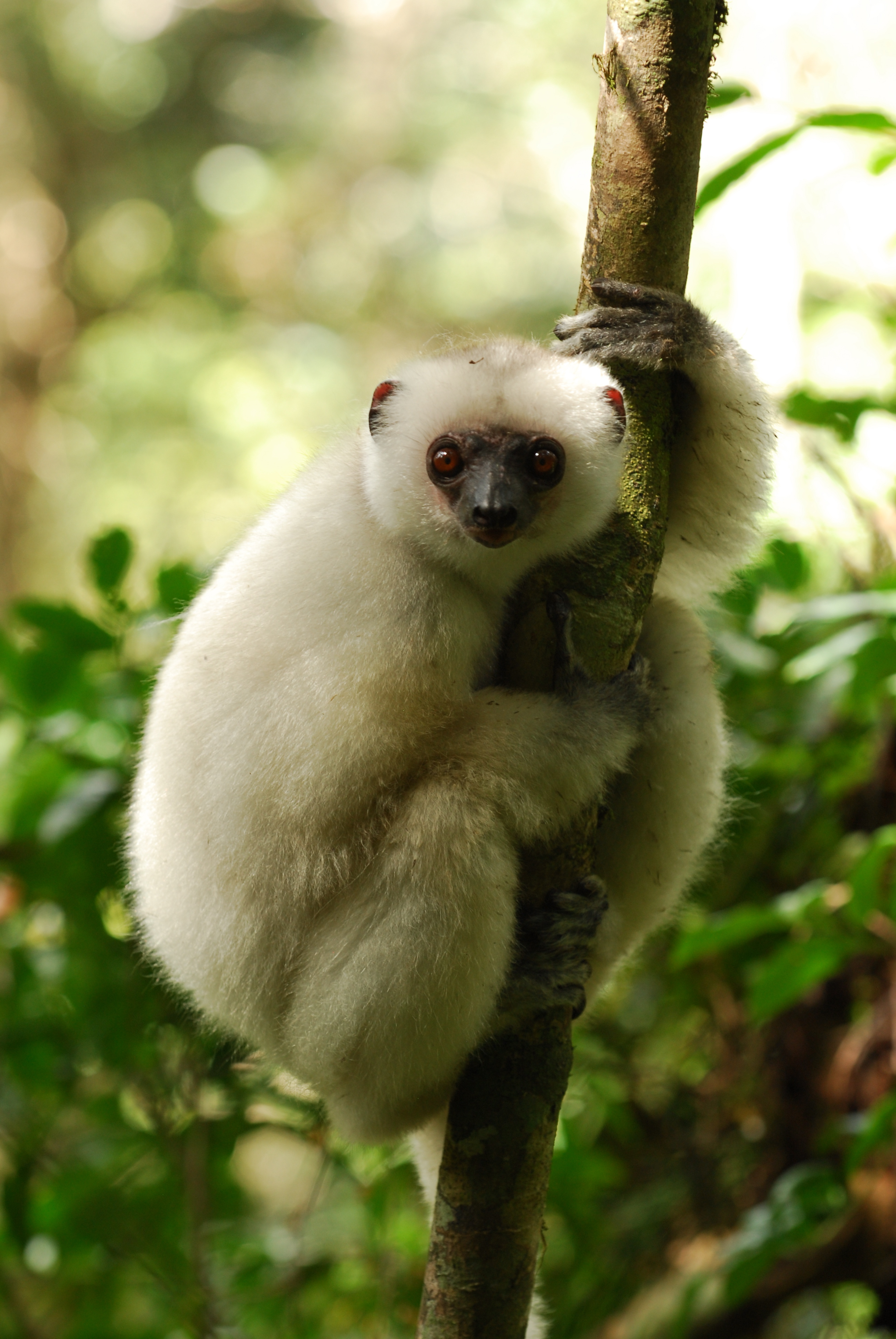
A silky sifaka (Propithecus candidus) in Makira Natural Park

Makira Natural Park (also referred to as Makira Forest Protected Area and Makira Protected Area) is a nature reserve in Madagascar's Northeastern region. In 2001, the Malagasy Ministry of Environment and Forests, in collaboration with the Wildlife Conservation Society (WCS), began a program to create a protected area in the Makira forests. Makira received temporary legal protection in December 2005 and was formally created as a natural park on 19 June 2012 by Decree No. 2012-641.

The park covers 372,470 hectares (3,724.7 km^{2}) of humid forest in the regions of Analanjirofo, Sava and Sofia, with a surrounding community-managed belt or protection zone of more than 350,000 hectares.

The Makira forests are one of the largest remaining blocks of humid forest in Madagascar's eastern rainforest biome. The park is noted for high levels of endemism, exceptionally rich palm diversity, important populations of threatened lemurs and endemic carnivores, and a long research record in conservation biology, ethnobotany, and rural livelihoods.

== Geography and climate ==
Makira lies inland from Antongil Bay, west and northwest of Maroantsetra, and forms part of the larger Masoala-Makira-Antongil Bay (MaMaBay) landscape of northeastern Madagascar. The area is rugged, with steep ridges, short elevational gradients, and a mixture of granitic, metamorphic, ultramafic and alluvial substrates..

The park lies in one of the wettest parts of Madagascar. There is no marked dry season; mean annual precipitation exceeds 3,500 mm and may reach about 5,900 mm, with year-round humidity around 85%. Rainfall in even the driest months of September and October averages 48mm, with a minimum average daily chance of rain of 23%. This persistent moisture, combined with strong topographic variation, helps explain the region's unusually high plant diversity rich diversity of forest composition.

== Biodiversity ==
=== Prioritisation schemes ===
==== Biodiversity Hotspot ====
Makira Natural Park lies within the Madagascar and the Indian Ocean Islands Biodiversity Hotspot recognised by Conservation International. This hotspot is characterised by exceptionally high levels of endemism and severe historical habitat loss, and is considered globally important for plant, reptile and mammal conservation.

==== Key Biodiversity Area (KBA) ====
Makira Natural Park is recognised as a Key Biodiversity Area (KBA) of international significance under the global KBA standard. The site qualifies for KBA status due to the presence of globally threatened and range-restricted species, including several critically endangered lemurs.

==== Endemic Bird Area (EBA) ====
Makira lies within BirdLife International's Endemic Bird Area (EBA) 094, East Malagasy wet forests, which encompasses the eastern humid forest belt of Madagascar and supports numerous range-restricted endemic bird species.

==== Alliance for Zero Extinction (AZE) ====
Makira is recognised as an Alliance for Zero Extinction (AZE) site. Trigger species associated with the site include the critically endangered silky sifaka (Propithecus candidus) and the endangered red ruffed lemur (Varecia rubra), whose distributions are largely restricted to the Marojejy–Makira–Masoala landscape in north-eastern Madagascar.

==== WWF Global 200 ====
Makira falls within the Madagascar humid forests ecoregion, part of the WWF Global 200 list of priority ecoregions identified for exceptional biodiversity and conservation importance.

==== Priority Area for Plant Conservation (PAPC / IPA) ====
Makira is included within Madagascar's network of Important Plant Areas / Priority Areas for Plant Conservation, identified through work led by the Missouri Botanical Garden and Malagasy conservation partners.

==== High Biodiversity Wilderness Area ====
Madagascar as a whole has been recognised as one of the world's major High Biodiversity Wilderness Areas due to its exceptional biodiversity combined with relatively large remaining areas of intact habitat.

=== Flora ===
The Makira project zone contains one of the largest remaining contiguous blocks of low- and mid-altitude evergreen humid forest in Madagascar. Botanical inventories carried out in and around the park, together with information drawn from historical herbarium collections and ongoing surveys, indicate that the park supports an exceptionally diverse flora that is broadly representative of the eastern humid forest biome. Native tree genera characteristic of the park include species in the families Sarcolaenaceae, Sapotaceae, Clusiaceae, Ebenaceae, Burseraceae, Phyllanthaceae, Anacardiaceae and Pandanaceae, as well as native palms (Dypsis spp.), Ravenala madagascariensis (the traveller's tree) and the raffia palm (Raphia farinifera).

==== Botanical ethnomedicines ====
Researchers at Harvard University Center for the Environment, Madagascar Health and Environmental Research, University of California and Maroantsetra District Public Hospital calculated the economic value of botanical ethnomedicines in the Makira Natural Parl (then Makira Protected Area) and estimated mean benefits of ethnomedicines per year at approximately US$5.40–7.90 per person, $30.20–44.30 per household, and between $756,050 and $1,110,220 for all residents. Regarding potential value of the Makira rainforest area through the lens of commercial pharmaceutical development, based on a calculation of 1 to 18 potentially novel drugs derived from ethnomedicines used in the area, and using current average sales value of novel FDA-approved pharmaceuticals, the author estimated that the protected area "could hold between $316 million to almost $6 billion of untapped revenue within its botanical diversity".

=== Fauna ===
==== Lemurs ====
The Makira forests are believed to support the highest lemur diversity of any protected area in Madagascar, with 17 species recorded. Notable taxa include three Critically Endangered species—the silky sifaka (Propithecus candidus), the indri (Indri indri) and the black-and-white ruffed lemur (Varecia variegata subsp. subcincta)—and the red ruffed lemur (Varecia rubra), whose global range is restricted to the Makira–Masoala region north of the Antainambalana River. The silky sifaka in particular is one of the rarest primates in the world and is highly restricted to the Makira–Anjanaharibe-Sud–Marojejy region, with its southern distributional limit at the Antainambalana River within Makira Natural Park. The park also harbours populations of the aye-aye (Daubentonia madagascariensis) and several other lemurs of conservation concern.

==== Other mammals ====
In addition to its lemurs, more than 50 mammal species have been recorded in the park, including the fossa (Cryptoprocta ferox, listed as Vulnerable on the IUCN Red List), Madagascar's largest endemic carnivore, as well as the falanouc (Eupleres goudotii) and 13 species of tenrecs. Several rodent species in the endemic family Nesomyidae, including members of the genera Eliurus and Nesomys, also occur.

==== Birds ====
More than 120 bird species have been recorded in Makira Natural Park, with the majority being endemic to Madagascar. Of particular significance is the diversity of vangas, with around 10 species present, including high densities of Bernier's vanga (Oriolia bernieri). Other notable birds of conservation concern include the Critically Endangered Madagascar serpent eagle (Eutriorchis astur) and the Madagascar red owl (Tyto soumagnei).

==== Reptiles and amphibians ====
The park's reptile and amphibian fauna is rich and highly endemic, with diverse assemblages typical of eastern Malagasy rainforests. Recorded amphibian genera include Boophis, Mantidactylus, Gephyromantis, Mantella, Stumpffia (including Stumpffia makira) and Plethodontohyla. Recorded reptiles include endemic Malagasy boas (Acrantophis madagascariensis and Sanzinia madagascariensis), multiple chameleon species in the genera Brookesia, Calumma and Furcifer, and the leaf-tailed geckos (Uroplatus spp.).

==== High Conservation Values ====
The park has been characterised as an area of global, regional and national biodiversity importance meeting all three biodiversity-related High Conservation Value categories: significant concentrations of biodiversity values (HCV 1); landscape-level ecosystems and intact forest landscapes supporting viable populations of naturally occurring species in natural patterns of distribution and abundance (HCV 2); and threatened or rare ecosystems (HCV 3). Hundreds of species occurring in the project zone are listed as threatened (Vulnerable, Endangered or Critically Endangered) on the IUCN Red List, with further species listed in the CITES appendices.

A rapid national ecosystem-services assessment also identified the Makira–Masoala landscape as important for multiple co-benefits, including climate regulation, freshwater provision, flood regulation and coastal protection. In Makira, watershed protection and reduced sediment delivery to Antongil Bay is as part of the rationale for landscape-scale protection.

== People ==
Surrounding the strictly protected core area, more than 350,000 hectares of community-managed forest are administered by approximately 80 local community associations known as Communautés de Base (COBAs), which have signed forest-management transfer contracts (Gestion Contractualisée des Forêts, GCF) with the Government of Madagascar. These COBAs play a central role in management, alternative-livelihood activities (such as improved agroforestry and value-chain support for vanilla, clove, cocoa and raffia), and participatory ecological monitoring. Around 90,000 people live in approximately 120 villages within or adjacent to the project area.

The human population in and around Makira Natural Park is predominantly of the Betsimisaraka and Tsimihety ethnic groups, almost all of whom are agriculturalists growing their own crops. These include subsistence crops such as rice and cassava, as well as cash crops such as vanilla and cloves. Local people also subsist on hunting and gathering, harvesting wildlife, honey, botanical ethnomedicines, and earth for consumption, with over 50% of people eating clay and riparian earth clods. The protein component of household diets in the region has been shown to depend in part on hunted wildlife. Reducing dependence on bushmeat through alternative protein sources (small livestock rearing, fisheries development and improved agricultural production) is therefore one of the principal conservation strategies implemented around the park.

The people of the Makira region are predominantly observant of traditional Malagasy religion and worship Zanahary, with Christianity being the second most common identity, though approximately 98% of the region's Christians still practise traditional Malagasy religion as part of their spirituality.

== Threats ==
Despite its biological significance, biodiversity within the park has been subject to substantial and increasing anthropogenic pressures. Before formal protection, deforestation in the wider Makira landscape was estimated at approximately 1,500 ha (3,700 acres) per year, with associated habitat loss and fragmentation, and rates were expected to rise over time. Madagascar-wide, annual deforestation rates increased after 2005, reaching approximately 99,000 ha per year during 2010–2014 (around 1.1% of national forest area per year), with about 46% of remaining forest located within 100 m (330 ft) of a forest edge.

The principal direct threat to biodiversity is unplanned deforestation driven by slash-and-burn agriculture (tavy), primarily for rain-fed rice cultivation and forest burning for grazing. This practice typically results in short cultivation cycles followed by abandonment or prolonged fallow periods, leading to progressive forest conversion and expansion into previously intact areas as the human population grows and demand for land increases. Additional direct threats include small-scale and illegal logging, forest clearing for pasture, artisanal mining and the use of fire, all of which contribute to habitat degradation and increased edge effects.

Hunting pressure constitutes a significant complementary threat, particularly for lemurs, terrestrial mammals and large-bodied birds. A study published in Oryx in 2009, based on interviews in 14 villages in and around the Makira forest, documented hunting of 23 mammal species for consumption and indicated that, because of the slow life histories of many target taxa, even relatively low harvest levels could be unsustainable for several species. Subsequent research has corroborated extensive exploitation of protected species across eastern Madagascar more broadly. Underlying drivers identified include rapid population growth in surrounding rural communities, high levels of poverty and food insecurity, limited livelihood alternatives, and weak governance over forest resources.

== Conservation ==
=== REDD+ project ===
Makira is the location of one of the world's first REDD+ (Reducing Emissions from Deforestation and forest Degradation) projects, with a start date of January 2005. In 2013, the Makira Natural Park REDD+ Project became the first government-owned REDD+ project in Africa to sell carbon credits on the voluntary carbon market, after achieving verification under the Verified Carbon Standard (VCS) and the Climate, Community and Biodiversity (CCB) Standards with triple Gold: Climate, Community and Biodiversity Gold Levels. The project's design emphasises avoided deforestation. A portion of carbon revenues are allocated to communities living around the protected area, supporting infrastructure, education, health services, sustainable agriculture and alternative livelihoods, with the remainder going to park management and governmental climate change initiatives.

== See also ==
- Protected areas of Madagascar
- Wildlife of Madagascar
- Conservation in Madagascar
- Masoala National Park
- Marojejy National Park
- Anjanaharibe-Sud Special Reserve
- Illegal logging in Madagascar
