= Malgachinsula anosibeella =

Scientific classification
- Domain: Eukaryota
- Kingdom: Animalia
- Phylum: Arthropoda
- Class: Insecta
- Order: Lepidoptera
- Family: Pyralidae
- Genus: Malgachinsula
- Species: M. anosibeella

Binomial name
- Malgachinsula anosibeella Roesler, 1982

Species of moth

Malgachinsula anosibeella is a species of snout moth in the genus Malgachinsula. It was described by Roesler in 1982, and is known from Madagascar.
