= Leaf-tailed gecko =

Leaf-tailed gecko may refer any of the below:

- Any of 14 species of geckos in the genus Uroplatus found in Madagascar
- Any of 9 species of geckos in the genus Phyllurus in Australia
- Any of 7 species of geckos in the genus Saltuarius found in Australia
- Long-necked northern leaf-tailed gecko, Orraya occultus in Australia
