= Sahantaha =

- Location in Madagascar
- Coordinates: 15°22′S 50°15′E
- Country: Madagascar
- Region: Sava
- District: Antalaha
- established: 2015
- Elevation: 18 m (59 ft)

Population (2019)Census
  - Total: 6,863
- Time zone: UTC3 (EAT)
- Postal code: 206

Sahantaha is a rural municipality in northern Madagascar. It belongs to the district of Antalaha, which is a part of Sava Region. The municipality has a populations of 6,863 inhabitants (2019).

It is situated on the coast, some 22 km south of Antalaha.

== Agriculture ==
The agriculture is mainly subsistential: rice, manioc, banana, sugar cane and coco nuts. Next to it also vanilla, cloves and coffee is planted.

== Tourism ==
- Masoala National Park.
