= Andranofotsy =

- Location in Madagascar
- Coordinates: 15°26′S 49°48′E
- Country: Madagascar
- Region: Ambatosoa
- District: Maroantsetra
- Elevation: 17 m (56 ft)

Population (2001)
  - Total: 8,000
- Time zone: UTC+3 (EAT)

Andranofotsy is a town and commune (Malagasy: kaominina) in Ambatosoa, Madagascar. It belongs to the district of Maroantsetra. The population of the commune was estimated to be approximately 8,000 in the 2001 commune census.

Primary and junior level secondary education are available in town. 95% of the population of the commune are farmers. The most important crops are rice and vanilla; also cloves are an important agricultural product. Services provide employment for 5% of the population.
