= Mount Ambohitra =

Mountain in Madagascar

- Location within Madagascar

Highest point
- Coordinates: 12.4833°S 49.2000°E

Geography
- Country: Madagascar
- Region: Diana

Ambohitra (Amber Mountain) is the highest mountain in northern Madagascar. It is south of Antsiranana. Its elevation is 1,475 m (4,838 ft) above sea level. The range in which it lies separate most of the northern part of the island from the rest of the island. Here much of the land is deforested for farming and cattle. As elsewhere on the island, much of the top soil is eroded away due to erosion caused by the deforestation and exacerbated by the large amounts of cattle grazing there.

The mountain is situated within Montagne d'Ambre National Park.
