= Route nationale 5 (Madagascar) =

Highway in Madagascar

Route information
- Length: 402 km (250 mi)

Major junctions
- From: Maroantsetra
- To: Toamasina

Location
- Country: Madagascar

Highway system
- Roads in Madagascar

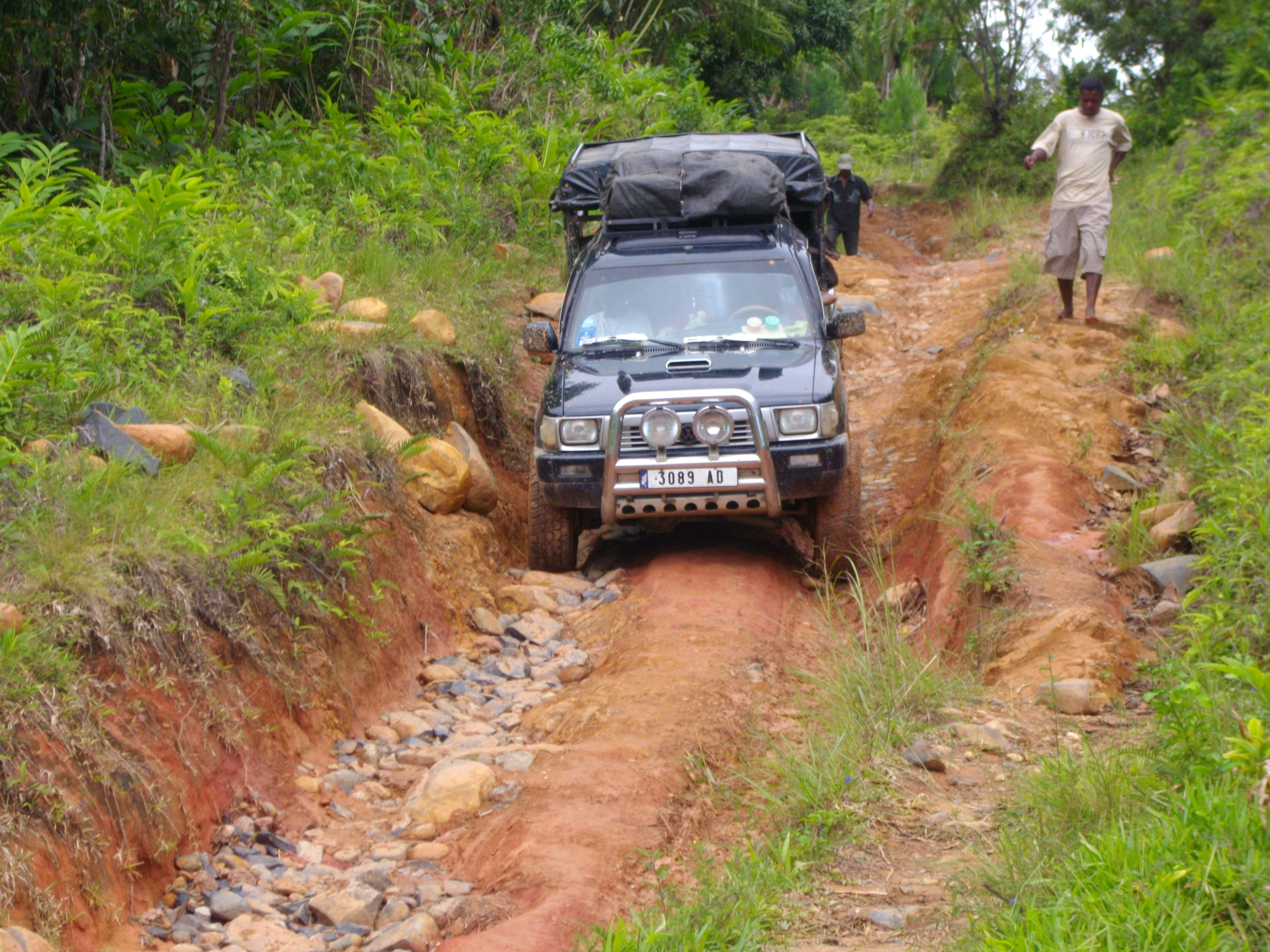
Route Nationale 5 (Madagascar)

Route nationale 5 (RN5) is a primary highway in Madagascar of 402 km. The route runs from Toamasina to Maroantsetra, a city on the eastern coast of the Madagascar.

The first 160 km until Soanierana Ivongo are paved and in good condition, but the remaining is unpaved and in a bad state of conservation. Several rivers must be crossed by ferry boats. The part from Soanierana Ivongo to Mananara Avaratra is scheduled to be paved in 2022.

== Selected locations on route (from North to South) ==
- Maroantsetra (Masoala National Park)
- Rantabe (river crossing)
- Fahambany (river crossing)
- Mananara Avaratra (ferry crossing Mananara river)
  - (Mananara-Nord National Park)
- Andrangazaha (ferry crossing Simianona river)
- Soanierana Ivongo (ferry over Marimbona river / ferry to Nosy Boraha )
  - (Ambatovaky Special Reserve)
- Manangory River crossing
- Fenoarivo Atsinanana (Fénérive)
  - (intersection with RN 22)
- Mahavelona (Foulpointe)
- Toamasina

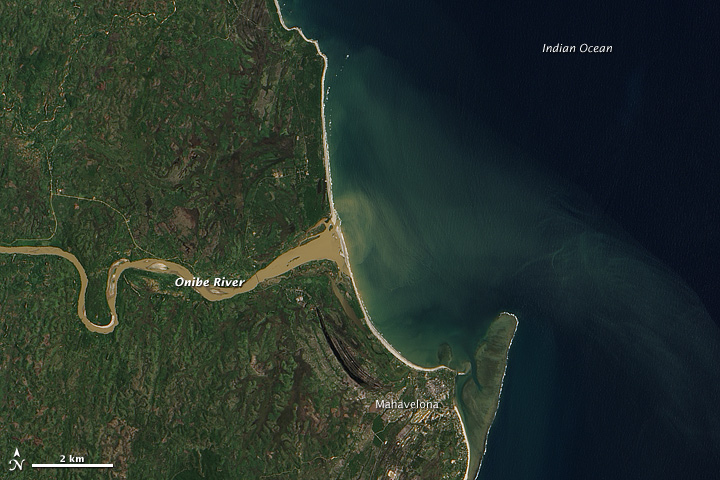
Onibe, near Foulpointe

== See also ==
- List of roads in Madagascar
- Transport in Madagascar
