= Antongil Bay =

Bay in Madagascar

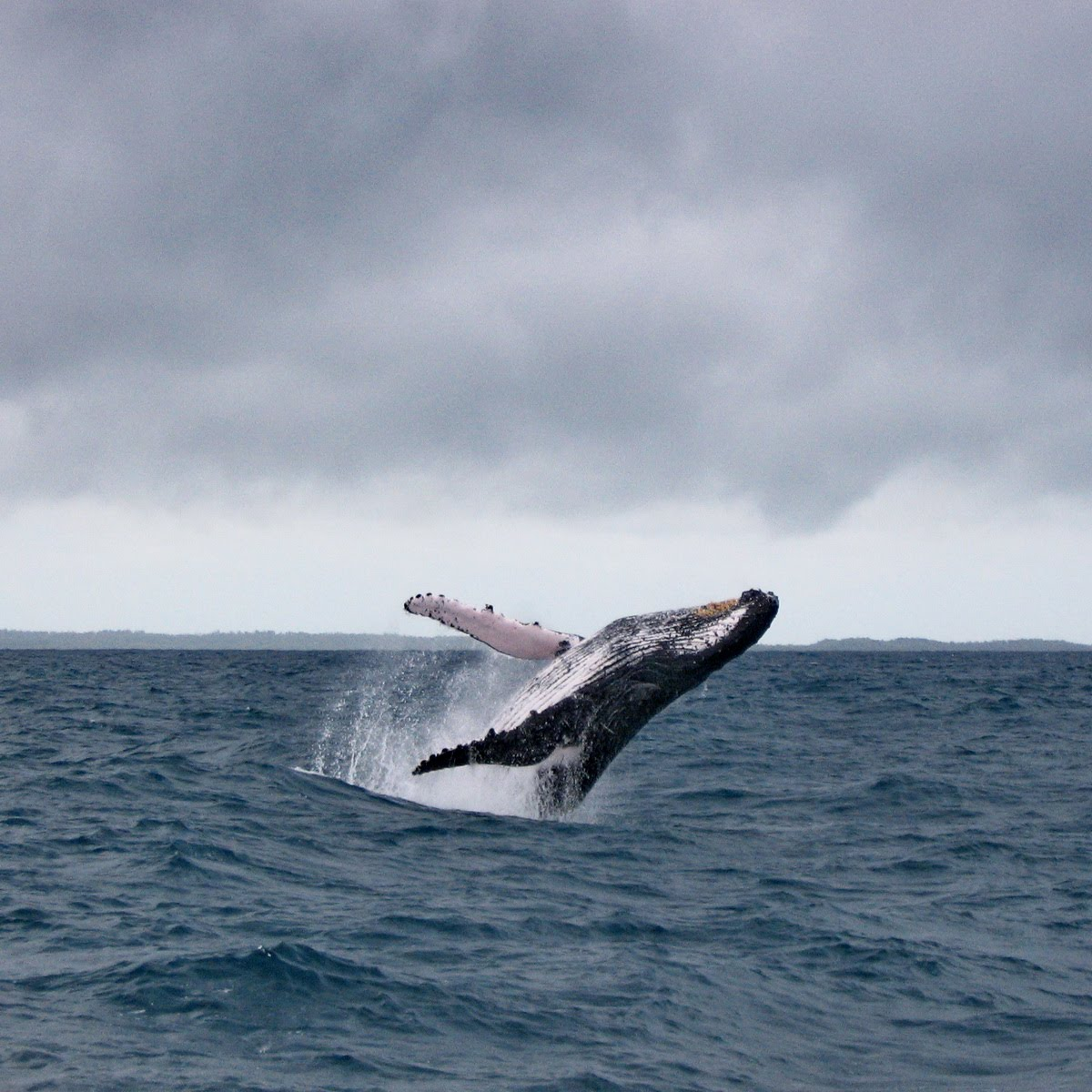
- Megaptera novaeangliae in Antongil Bay

- Location within Madagascar
- Location: Ambatosoa, Madagascar
- Coordinates: 15°45′00″S 49°50′25″E
- River sources: Antainambalana River
- Ocean/sea sources: Indian Ocean
- Basin countries: Madagascar
- Settlements: Maroantsetra

Helodranon Antongila (Bay of Antongila), more commonly called Antongil Bay in English, is the largest bay in Madagascar. This bay is on the island's east coast, toward the northern end of the eastern coastline of the island. It is mostly surrounded by the administrative region of Ambatosoa.

The bay is about 44 miles (71 km) long and 19 miles (31 km) wide, and fairly shallow, with its deepest point approximately 400 feet (120 m) deep. The island Nosy Mangabe and the town of Maroantsetra are situated at the northern end of the bay, while the southern end of the bay is near the site of the town of Mananara Avaratra and the mouth of the Mananara River. Forming the eastern edge of the bay is the Masoala peninsula.

== Etymology ==
Some believe that the name of the bay comes from a contraction of "aguada datam Gonçalves," which appeared on Portuguese portolan charts. In this expression, the term "Gonçalves" refers to the naval officer Antonio Gonçalves. Another hypothesis suggests that the bay owes its name to Antonio Gillo, who is said to have been the first Portuguese captain to sail in this area.

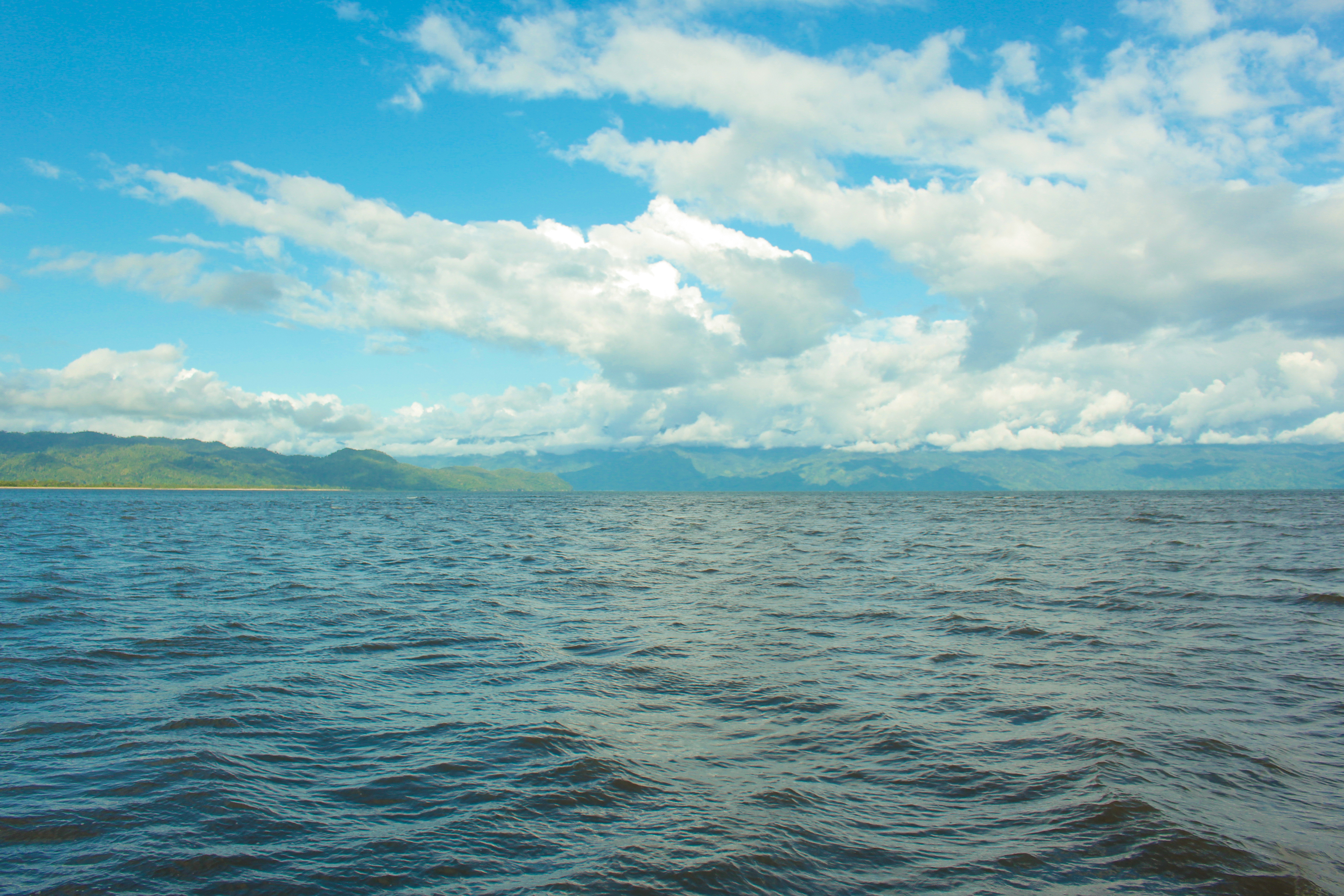
View on Maroantsetra from the bay - Madagascar

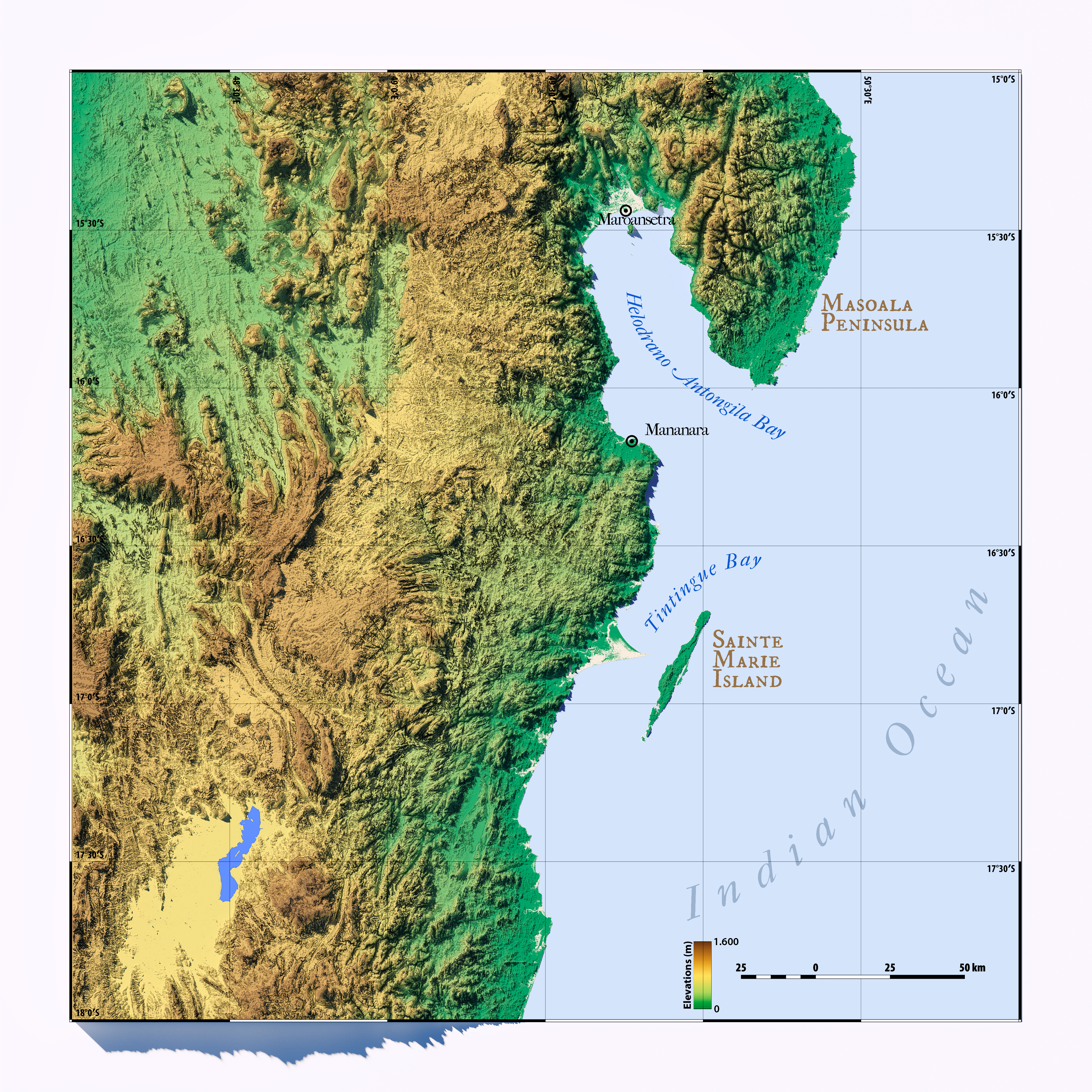
Topographic map of Antongil Bay
