= Antainambalana River =

Antainambalana River Tingballe

- Map of Malagasy rivers (Antainambalana flows into the Bay of Antongil and the Indian Ocean).

Location
- Country: Madagascar
- Region: Ambatosoa

Physical characteristics
- Source confluence: Mafaika River and Manampara River
- Mouth: Antongil Bay
  - location: Maroantsetra
  - coordinates: 15°45′00″S 48°32′44″E
  - elevation: 0 m (0 ft)
- Basin size: 5,902 km^{2} (2,279 mi^{2})

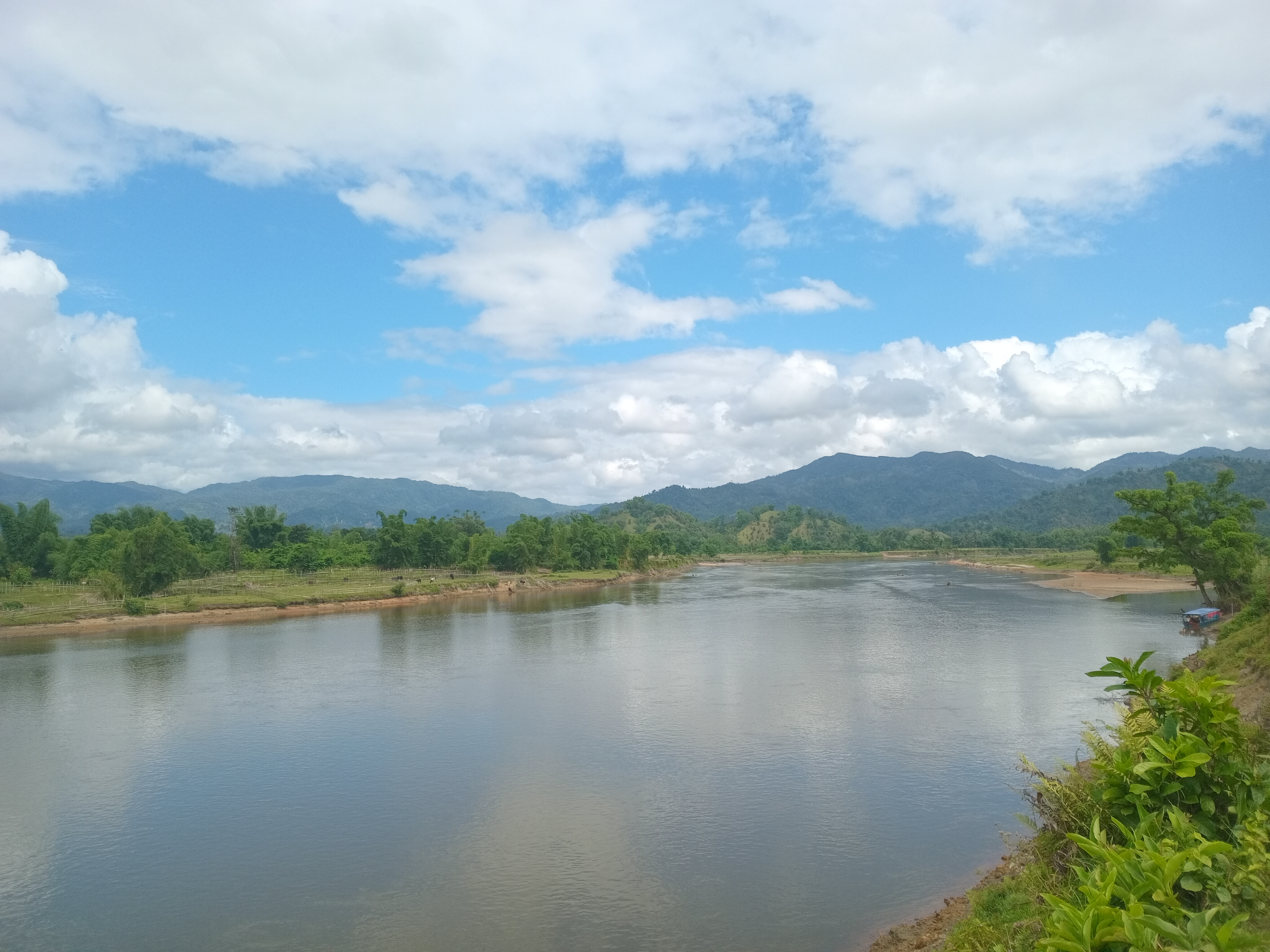
Antanambalana River

The Antainambalana (Also known as Antainambalan on some maps) is a river in the region of Ambatosoa in north-eastern Madagascar. It flows down from the highlands to flow into the Bay of Antongil and the Indian Ocean near Maroantsetra. Its basin has the size of 5,902 km^{2} (2,279 mi^{2}).

== History ==
In the 18th century this river was called Tingballe River by early European navigators.
