= Maroantsetra =

Maroantsetra Louisbourg
- Commune and town
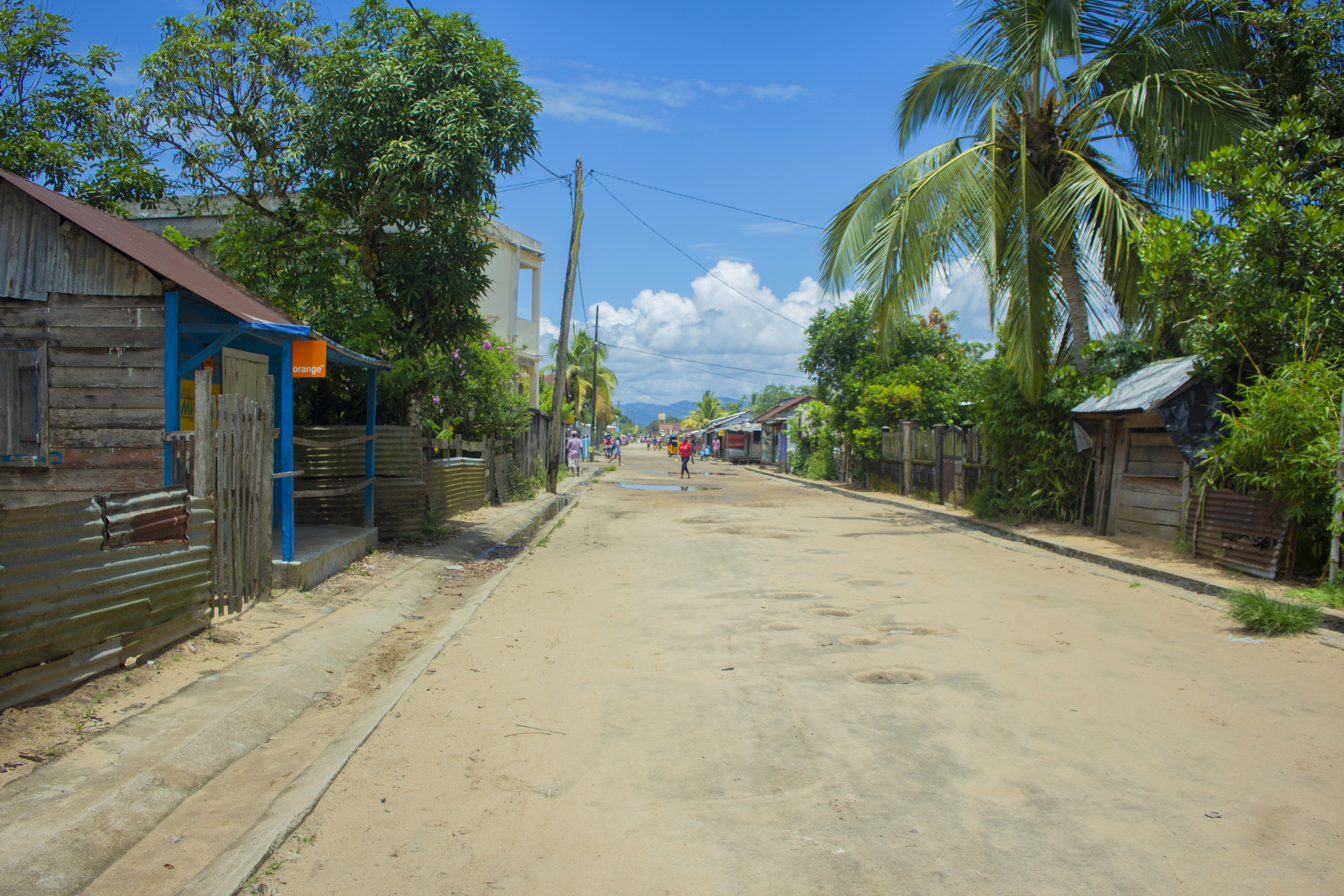
- Nickname: Maroa
- Motto: Antimaroa tsy mandeha tsy an-dakaña
- Location in Madagascar
- Coordinates: 15°26′0″S 49°45′0″E
- Country: Madagascar
- Region: Ambatosoa
- District: Maroantsetra

Government
  - Type: Urban municipality
  - Mayor: Ahmad Ch. Soilihi
- Elevation: 14 m (46 ft)

Population (2018)Census
  - Total: 42,529
- Demonym: Antimaroa
- Time zone: UTC+3 (EAT)
- Postal code: 512

Maroantsetra [maronˈtseʈʂə̥], formerly Louisbourg, is a market town and port in Madagascar. Located at the northern end of the Bay of Antongil on Madagascar's east coast, it is the capital of Ambatosoa, the country's newest administrative region. In 2018, Maroantsetra counted 42,529 people. Even though it is a small city, Maroantsetra played an important role in the Betsimisaraka history as the unification of this tribe by Ratsimilaho started there. Throughout the 18th century, Maroantsetra was involved in the reccurent attacks carried by the Sakalavas and the Betsimisarakas against the islands of Comoros and some east African countries.Such attacks might have been motivated by the increasing need for commodities imposed by European imperialism in the region. A scholar argued that the first Anglo-American pirates who sailed into the Indian Ocean during the 1680s visited Madagascar for provisions. Communities on the east coast were then struggling to control and benefit from commerce with Europeans, but they likely found this task impossible without dominating the trade routes that stretched far into the interior. By 1655, the French found that frequent warfare between populations on Nosy Boraha and Antongil Bay was contributing to a strong demand for guns by populations living near the bay.

== History ==
Maurice Benyovszky arrived in Maroantsetra in February 1774. He established a colony here, which was named Louisbourg. A hospital was built as well as a quarantine post on Nosy Mangabe island just off the coast.

== Geography and climate ==
Maroantsetra is a coastal town in northeastern Madagascar, approximately 900 kilometres (560 mi) by air northeast of Antananarivo. The Antainambalana River flows into the bay after meandering around the town. It is one of the wettest places in Madagascar due to the trade winds, and receives an average of 138 inches (350 cm) of rain annually.

Maroantsetra is the main point of access to Masoala National Park, Makira Natural Park, and the Antongil Bay area as a whole, including the Nosy Mangabe special reserve. The Wildlife Conservation Society, which has an office in Maroantsetra refer to these areas collectively as the MaMaBay region.

== Transport ==
The town is served by Maroantsetra Airport. The National road 5 links the town to Toamasina, although it is unpaved and in notoriously poor condition.

The Melissa Express passenger boat operates between the town and Mananara, and further on to Soanierana and Ivongo. The trip to Mananara typically takes about three hours and runs twice a week between September and February, though the service is not always reliable due to adverse weather conditions. Cargo boats permit passengers and travel to Mananara, Île Sainte Marie, Tamatave and Antalaha.

== Notable people ==
- Jacques Rabemananjara (1913–2005), politician and writer
- Johanita Ndahimananjara (June 5, 1960), medical practitioner and politician

== Gallery ==
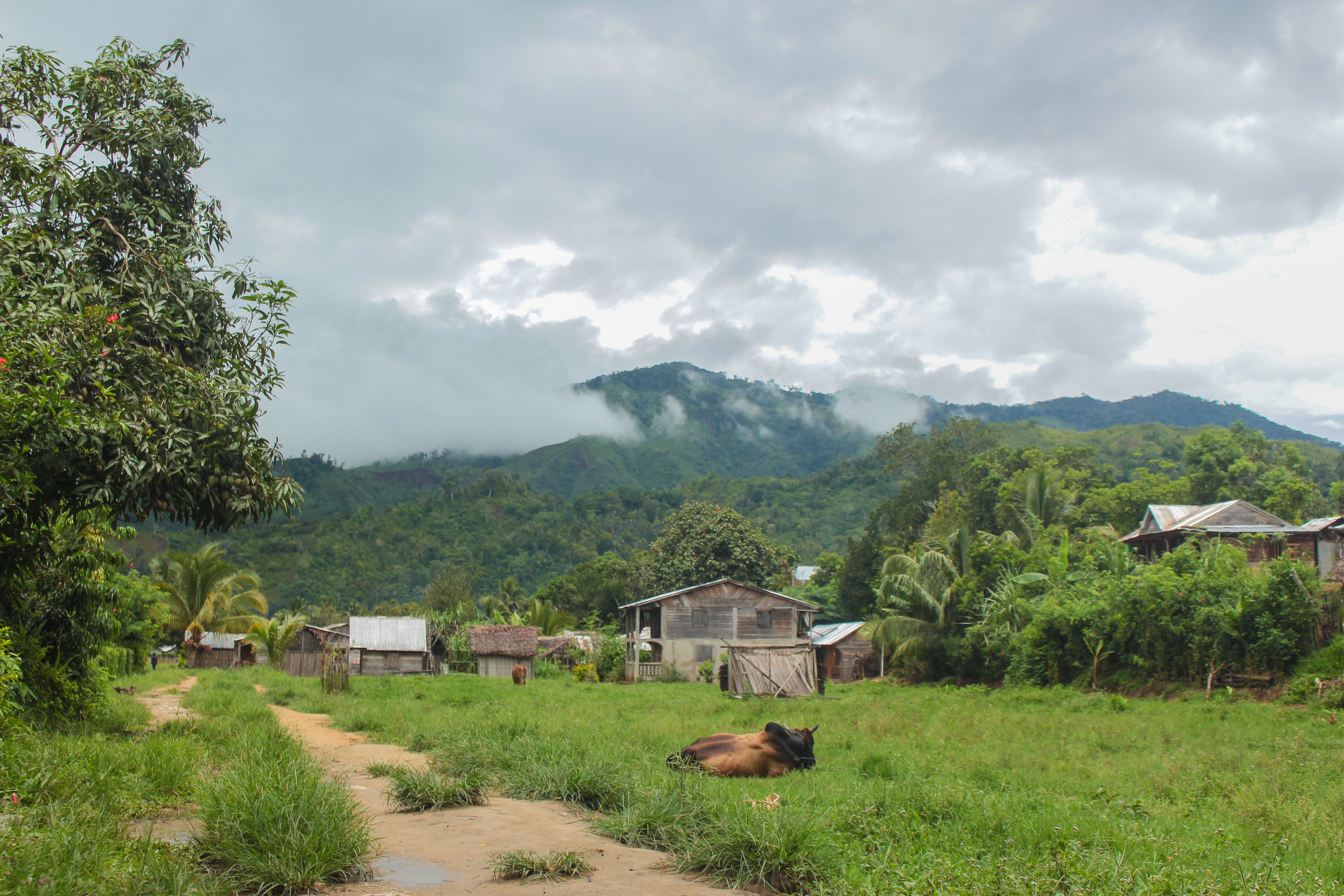
Fizono, a village of Maroantsetra

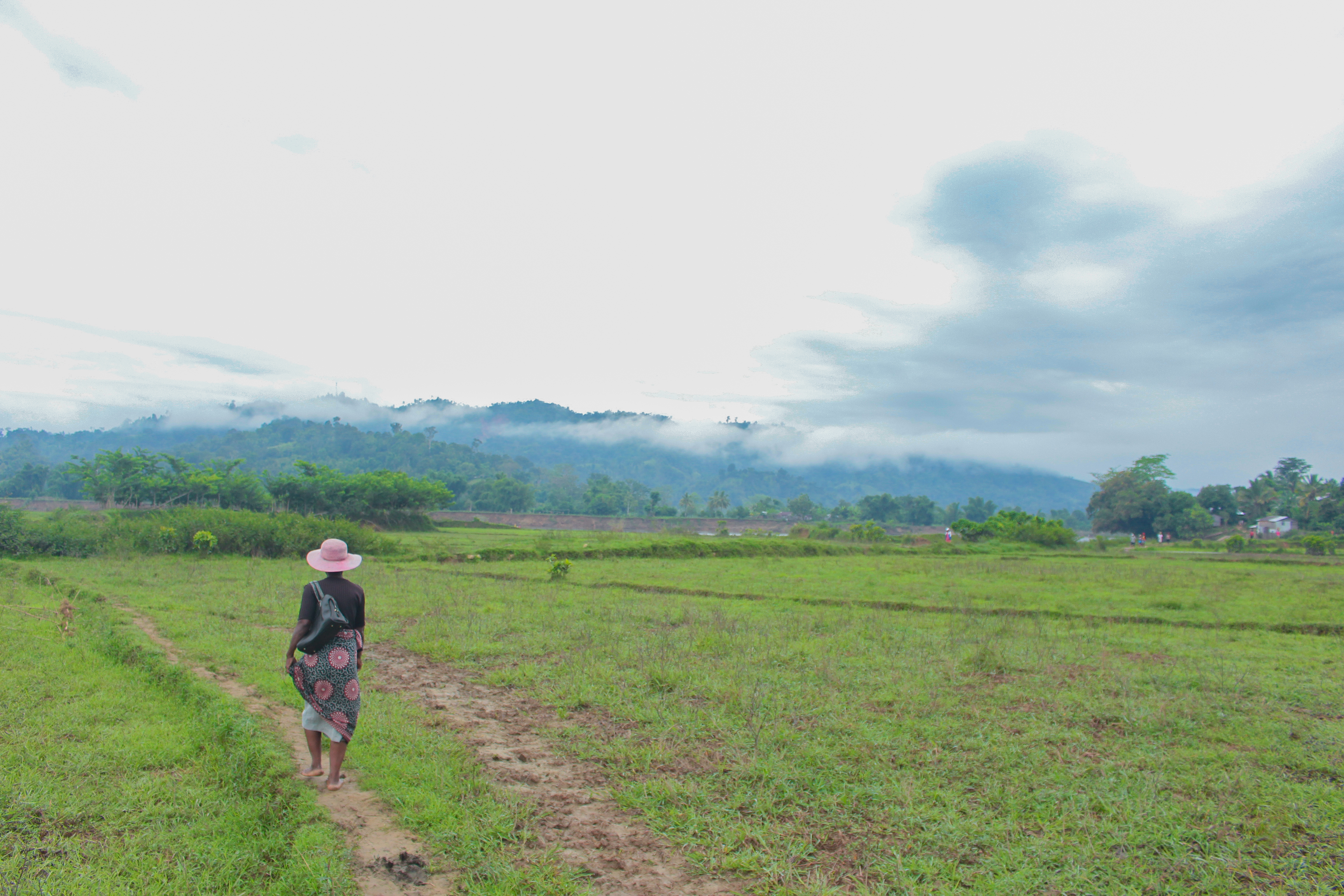
Sahamadia

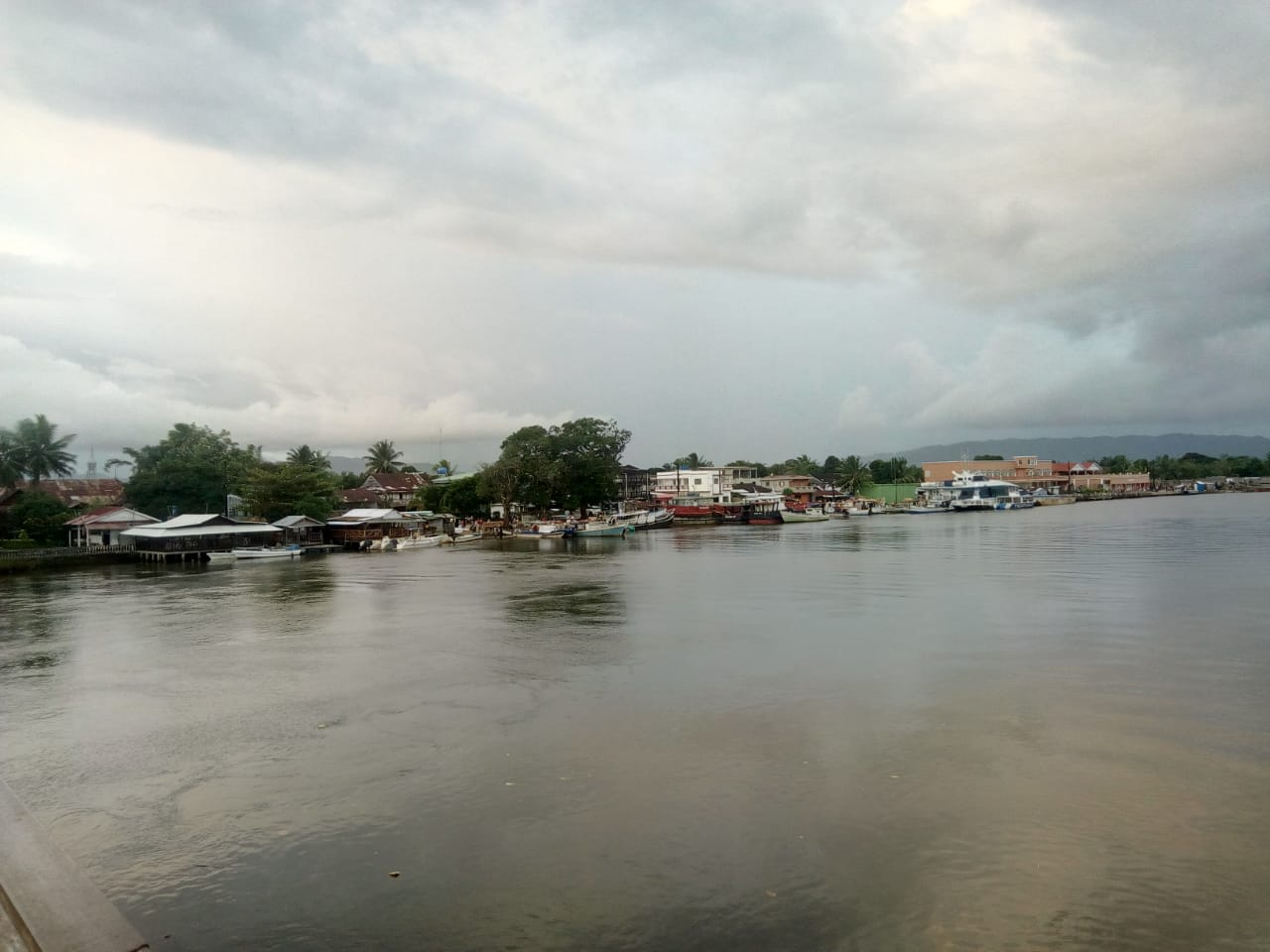
Harbour

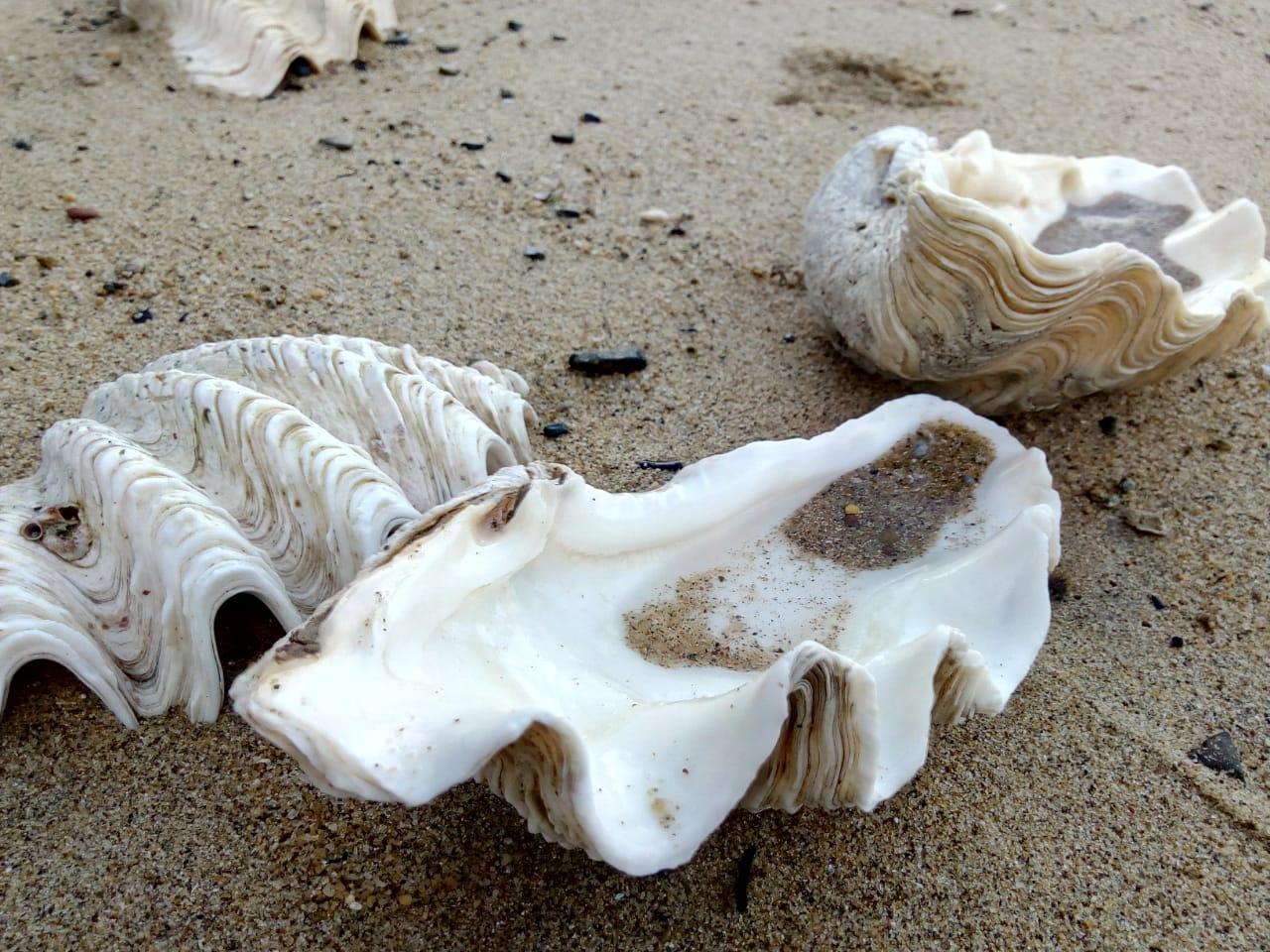

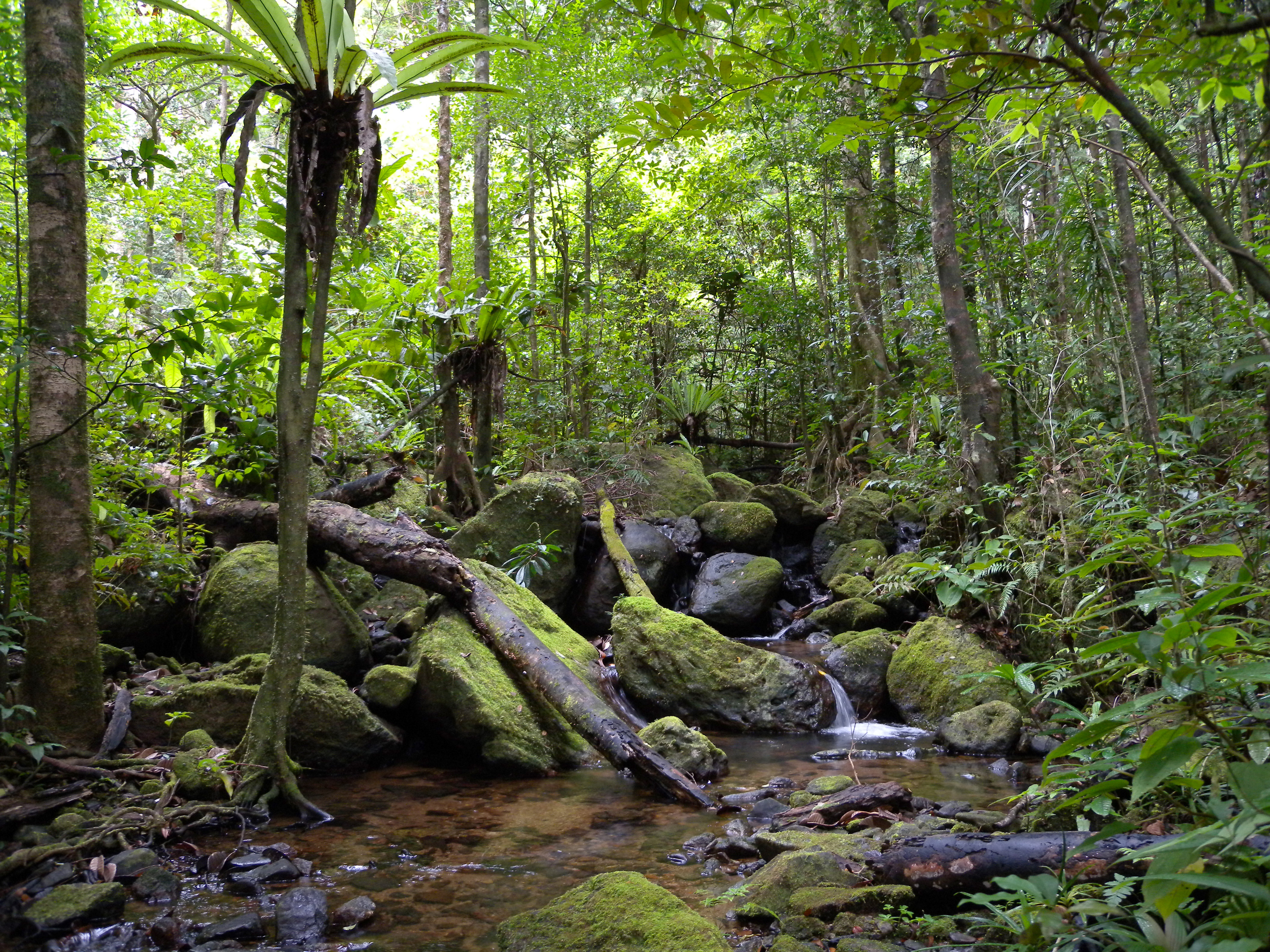
Masoala National Park
