= Masoala National Park =

- IUCN category II (national park)
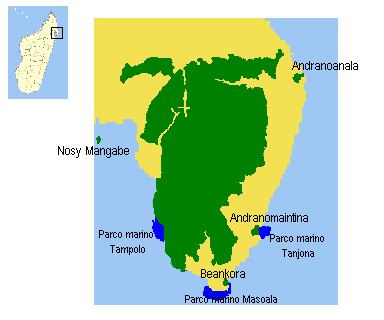
- Masoala National Park
- Interactive map of Masoala National Park
- Location: North-eastern Madagascar
- Nearest city: Maroantsetra and Antalaha
- Coordinates: 15°18′13″S 50°03′09″E
- Area: 2,400 km^{2} (930 sq mi)
- Established: 1997
- Visitors: 3000 (in 2005)
- Governing body: Madagascar National Parks Association
- Website: www.masoala.org
- Location within Madagascar

UNESCO World Heritage Site
- Official name: Parc National de Masoala
- Part of: Rainforests of the Atsinanana
- Includes: locations 002 to 007
- Criteria: Natural: (ix), (x)
- Reference: 1257
- Inscription: 2007 (31st Session)
- Endangered: 2010–...

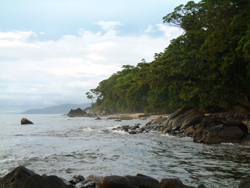
The forested coast of Masoala National Park

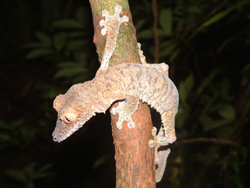
A leaf-tailed gecko, Uroplatus fimbriatus, one of Madagascar's extraordinary endemic reptiles

Masoala National Park, in northeast Madagascar, is the largest of the island's protected areas. Most of the park is situated in Sava Region and a part in Ambatosoa. Created in 1997, the park protects 2,300 square kilometres of rainforest and 100 square kilometres of marine park. The Masoala Peninsula is exceptionally diverse due to its large size and variety of habitats. Altogether, the park protects tropical rainforest, coastal forest, flooded forest, marsh, and mangrove. Three marine parks protect coral reefs and a dazzling array of marine life.

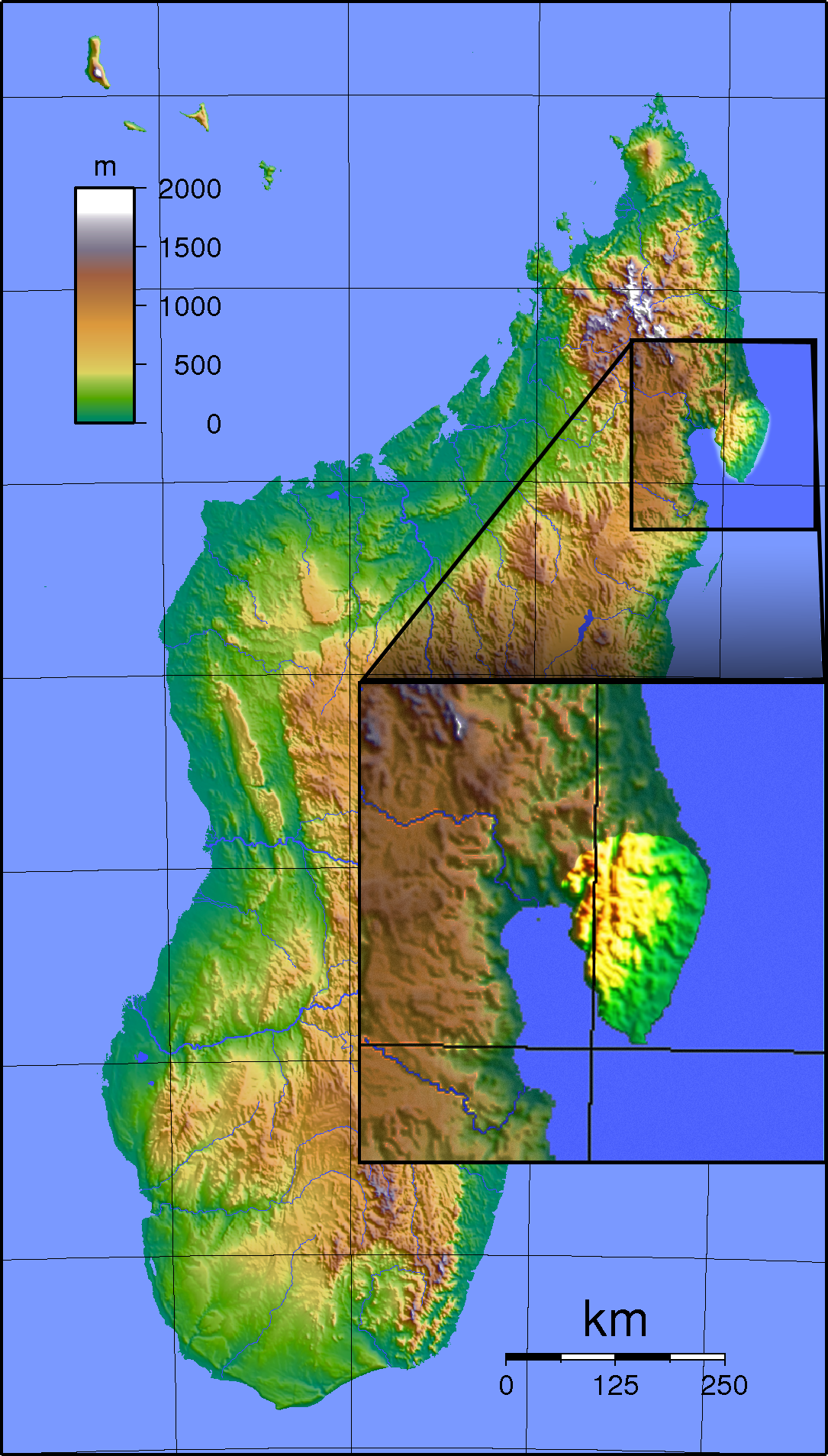
Location of Masoala National Park

== Climate ==
This is an exceptionally wet area of Madagascar. The driest part of the year is from September to December. As the park is accessible only by a three-hour boat journey, the cyclone season (January to March) is best avoided.

== Flora and fauna ==
There are ten lemur species, including the red ruffed lemur, which is native to the peninsula. The island reserve of Nosy Mangabe is one of the best sites in Madagascar to try to glimpse the elusive nocturnal aye-aye.

Masoala harbors many other species, such as the Madagascar day gecko, leaf-tailed gecko, chameleons of all sizes, spectacular birds such as the helmet vanga, and rare species such as the red owl and tomato frog. Masoala is also home to the day-flying sunset moth, Chrysiridia rhipheus. The Madagascar serpent-eagle was recently rediscovered here, and exists in healthy populations only in this part of northeast Madagascar.

The tree Ephippiandra masoalensis is endemic to the park.

Three marine parks are included in the Masoala National Park: Tampolo in the West, Ambodilaitry in the South, and Ifaho in the East. These are among the most diverse marine environments in Madagascar and are superb destinations for kayaking and snorkeling.

Each year from July to early September, hundreds of humpback whales visit the Antongil Bay during their long migration. The warm protected waters of the bay provide an ideal breeding and calving ground for these marine mammals.

== Conservation and threats ==
In June 2007, Masoala was designated a World Heritage Site as part of a cluster of parks known collectively as Rainforests of the Atsinanana, which represent the biodiversity of the country's eastern rainforests. The other national parks included are Marojejy, Zahamena, Ranomafana, Andringitra, and Andohahela.

During 2009 and 2010, the national park was invaded by thousands of illegal loggers searching for rosewood.

== See also ==
- Antongil Bay
- Illegal logging in Madagascar
- National parks of Madagascar
- Masoala, Madagascar
