= Ambatosoa =

- Region
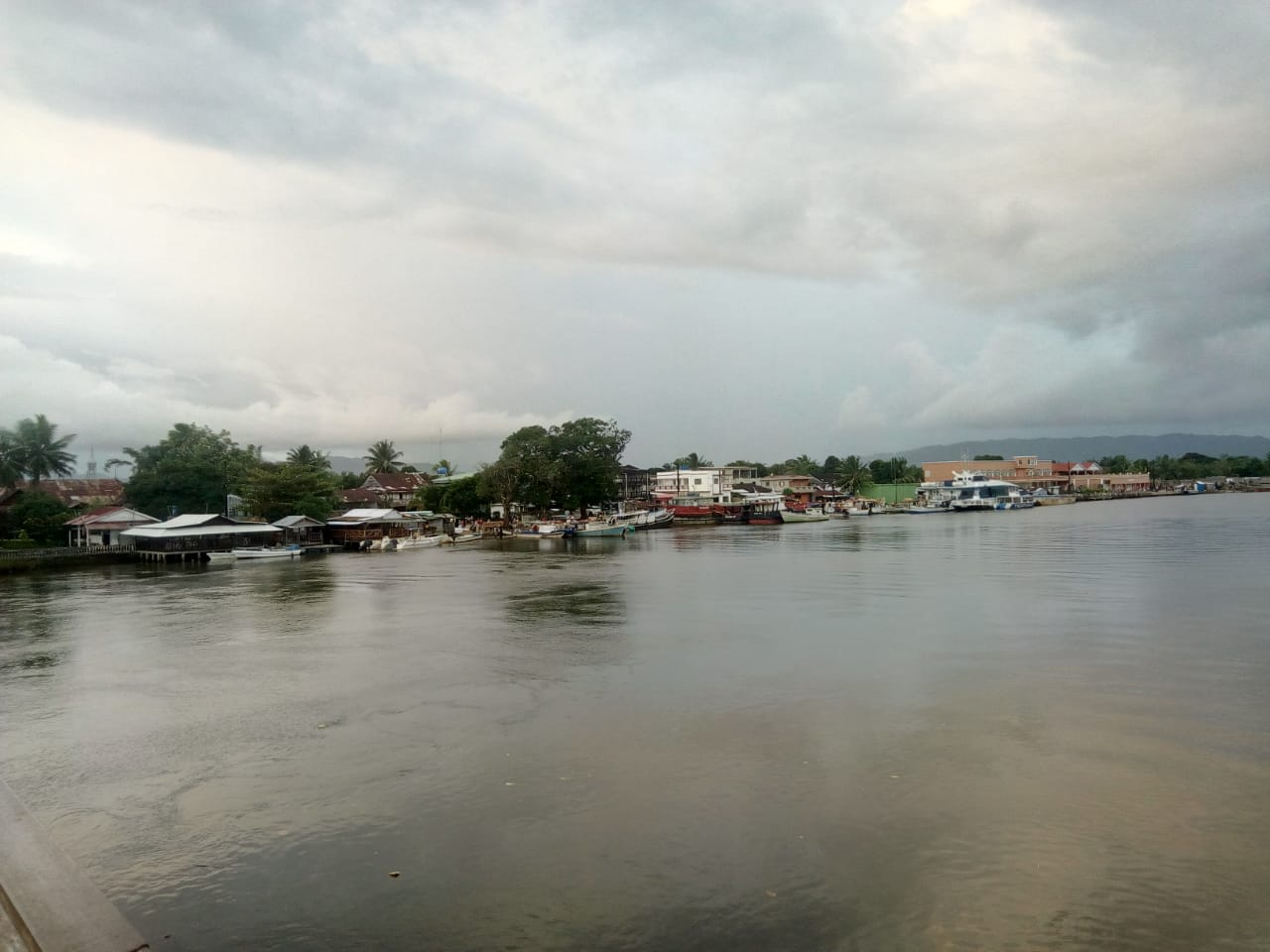
- The waterfront at Maroantsetra, the capital of Ambatosoa

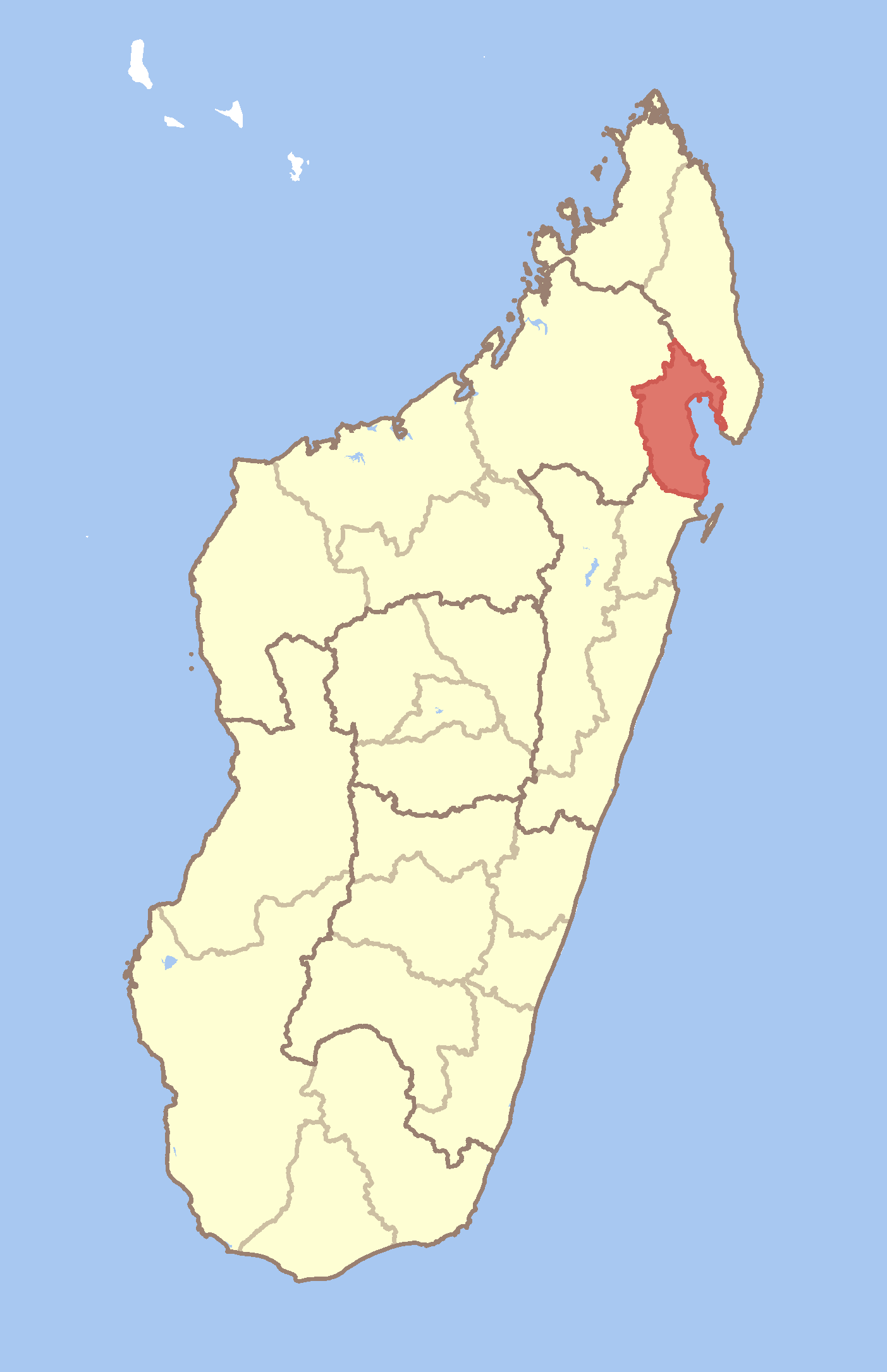
- Location of Ambatosoa in Madagascar
- Coordinates: 16°S 49.5°E
- Country: Madagascar
- Inaugurated: 26 July 2025
- Capital: Maroantsetra

Government
  - Prefect: Rabefenara Louis Velombity

Area
  - Total: 11,196 km^{2} (4,323 sq mi)

Population (2018 census)
  - Total: 491,077
  - Density: 43.862/km^{2} (113.60/sq mi)
- Time zone: UTC+3 (EAT)

Ambatosoa is a region in northeastern Madagascar. It was created in 2023 from the northern part of Analanjirofo, and the region was inaugurated on 26 July 2025. Its capital is Maroantsetra. Its name means "pleasant rock" in Malagasy, a reference to the region's rich mineral resources.

== Geography and climate ==
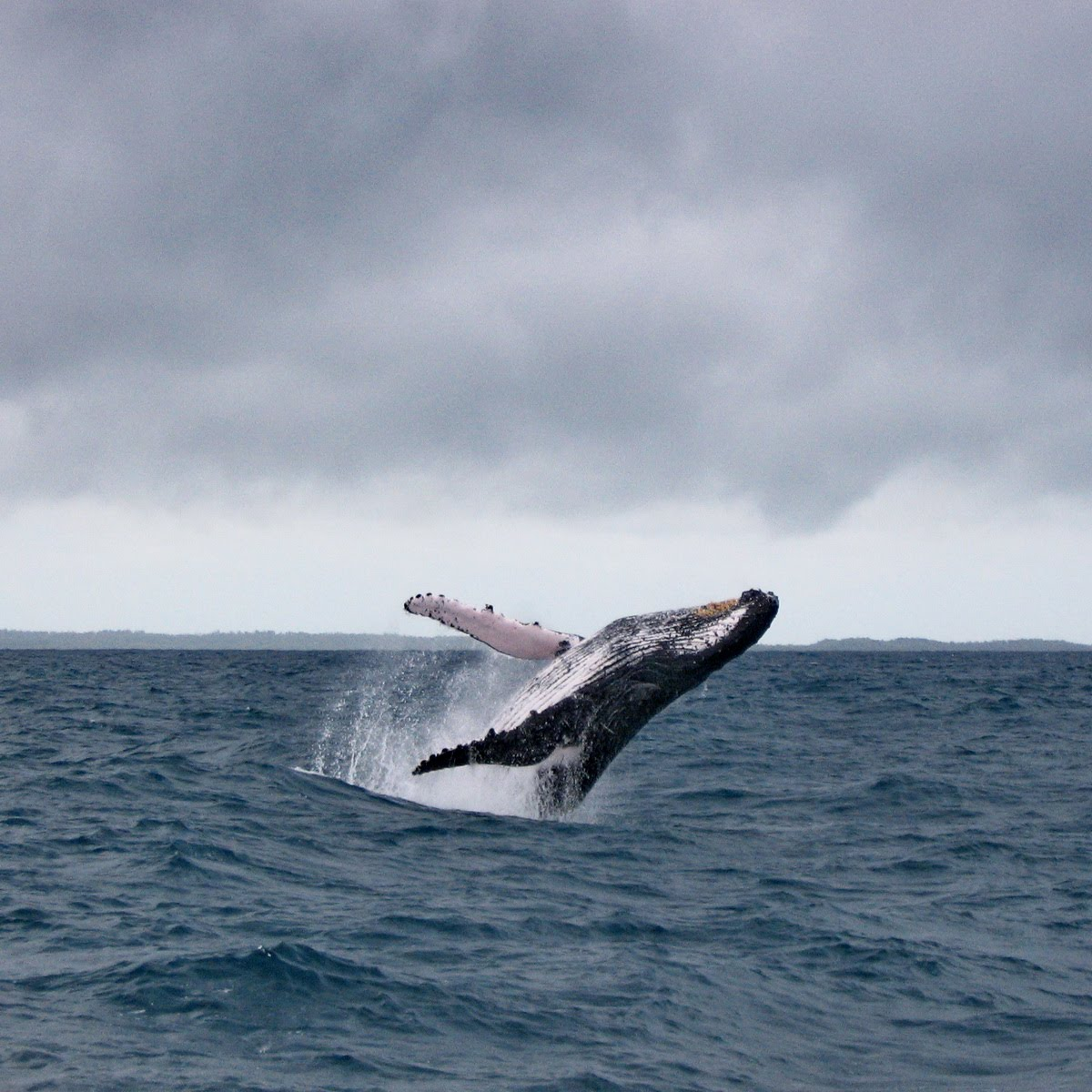
Humpback whale breaching in Antongil Bay

Ambatosoa is located on Antongil Bay on the northeast coast of Madagascar. It borders Sava to the north, Sofia to the west, and Analanjirofo to the south. Its two districts cover an area of 11,196 square kilometres (4,323 sq mi).

Antongil Bay is the largest bay on the east coast of Madagascar, covering an area of 2,800 square kilometres (1,100 sq mi). The IUCN Species Survival Commission has identified it as an Important Marine Mammal Area, as it is an important calving ground for humpback whales. The Species Survival Commission has also identified it as an Important Shark and Ray Area, and the government of Madagascar established a shark sanctuary in the bay in 2015. The largest island in the bay is Nosy Mangabe, which has been protected as a Special Reserve for the aye-aye since 1965.

The Antainambalana River is the largest river of Ambatosoa. Approximately 200 kilometres (120 mi) long, its headwaters are located in the region of Sofia, and it drains into Antongil Bay at Maroantsetra. Rivers of Ambatosoa that drain into the western side of Antongil Bay include, from north to south, the Voloina, Rantabe, Fananehana, Fahambahy, North Mananara, and Anove rivers. The largest rivers in the region located east of the Antainambalana are the Andranofotsy and Ambanizana rivers.

Mananara-Nord National Park, a UNESCO Biosphere Reserve, lies wholly within Ambatosoa, as do parts of Makira Natural Park and Masoala National Park, Masoala being part of the Rainforests of the Atsinanana World Heritage Site. The aforementioned Nosy Mangabe Special Reserve and the Andreba Harmonious Protected Landscape are also located in the region.

Ambatosoa is situated on the northern end of the Antongil Craton, an Archean craton that has affinities with the Dharwar Craton in southern India. Significant deposits of beryl, gold and quartz have been found in the region.

Like other parts of Madagascar's east coast, Ambatosoa experiences a tropical rainforest climate, receiving approximately 2,000 millimetres (79 in) of rain per year. Maroantsetra is the wettest place in Madagascar, receiving up to 3,000 millimetres (120 in) of rain per year, a result of its location at the head of Antongil Bay into which the trade winds are funneled. Ambatosoa is located in the Madagascar humid forests ecoregion.

== History ==
Archaeological excavations at Nosy Mangabe and Mananara Avaratra show that human habitation in Ambatosoa dates to the eighth century. In 1503, Diogo Fernandes Pereira became the first European known to have visited Antongil Bay. Antongil Bay and Nosy Mangabe in particular served as a resupply point for Dutch, English and French ships throughout the 16th to 18th centuries. Towards the end of that period, it also became a slave-trading port.

The Tsimihety people originated in the 16th and 17th centuries in the Rantabe and Mananara valleys on the coast of Antongil Bay, but moved inland by the mid-18th century. Their departure coincides with the unification of the Betsimisaraka nation under Ratsimilaho, who controlled the coast from Maroantsetra south to Toamasina. Originally fishermen, the Betsimisaraka were victims of Mascarene (European), Sakalava and Sihanaka slave trafficking in the 17th and 18th centuries, but later became formidable pirates themselves, pillaging as far as the Comoros and the East African coast in the late 18th century. The presence of small numbers of Makoa people in the region is probably a result of these expeditions. In the last quarter of the 19th century through the beginning of the 20th century, the Tsimihety started returning to the area, settling especially around the trail connecting Mandritsara and Mananara Avaratra, and between the Mananara and Antainambalana rivers.

Ambatosoa was one of the 28 regions created in Madagascar's 1994 decentralization law, which was never implemented. It was recreated on 29 June 2023 by separating the districts of Mananara Avaratra and Maroantsetra from Analanjirofo. The region was officially inaugurated on 26 July 2025 with the installation of Rabefenara Louis Velombity as the region's first prefect. The region's governor has yet to be appointed as of July 2025.

== Administrative divisions ==
Ambatosoa is divided into the districts of Mananara Avaratra and Maroantsetra, which are subdivided into 16 and 20 communes respectively.

== Demographics ==
The two districts making up Ambatosoa recorded a combined population of 491,077 in the 2018 Madagascar census. The largest towns in the region are Maroantsetra and Mananara Avaratra, which recorded populations of 42,529 and 35,148 respectively in the 2018 census. The Betsimisaraka people are the majority ethnic group in the region, although the Tsimihety people form a significant minority.

== Economy ==
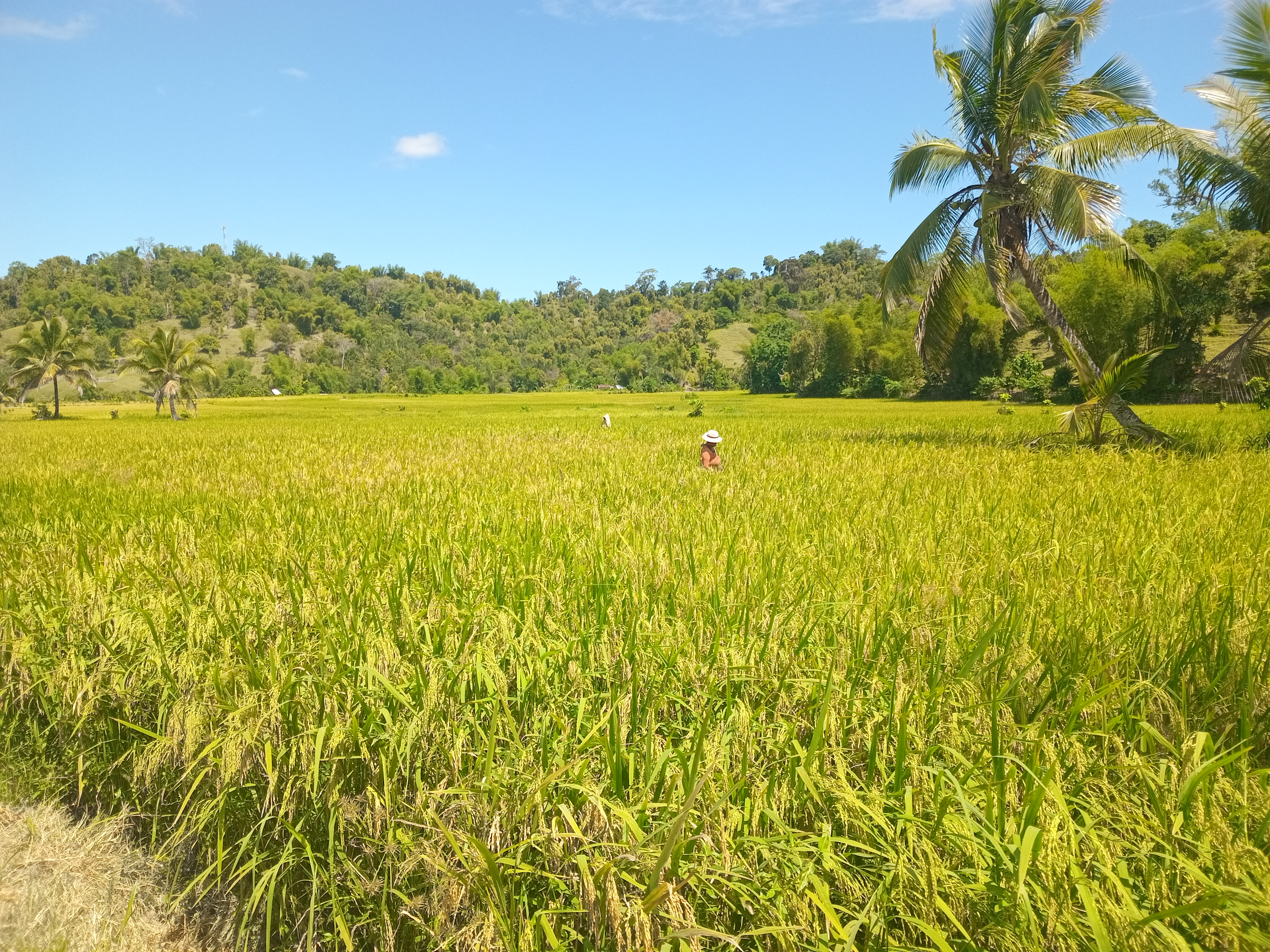
Rice fields near Ambalamahogo in the district of Maroantsetra

Agriculture employs a large majority of Ambatosoa's population. The region is a leading producer of cloves (accounting for more than half of farmers' incomes in the region) and vanilla in Madagascar, and also produces fruit such as lychee and banana, coffee, and rice.

The company Prexmin (Prospection Exploitation Minière) based in Maroantsetra mines industrial and gem-quality quartz in the region.

== Transport ==
Maroantsetra and Mananara Avaratra are linked to Soanierana Ivongo in the south by the coastal National Road 5, although this portion of the road is an unpaved track in notoriously poor condition.

Madagascar Airlines provides scheduled service from the national capital Antananarivo to Maroantsetra Airport. The company Melissa Express operates a ferry service between Soanierana Ivongo, Mananara Avaratra and Maroantsetra.
