= Emília Vášáryová filmography =

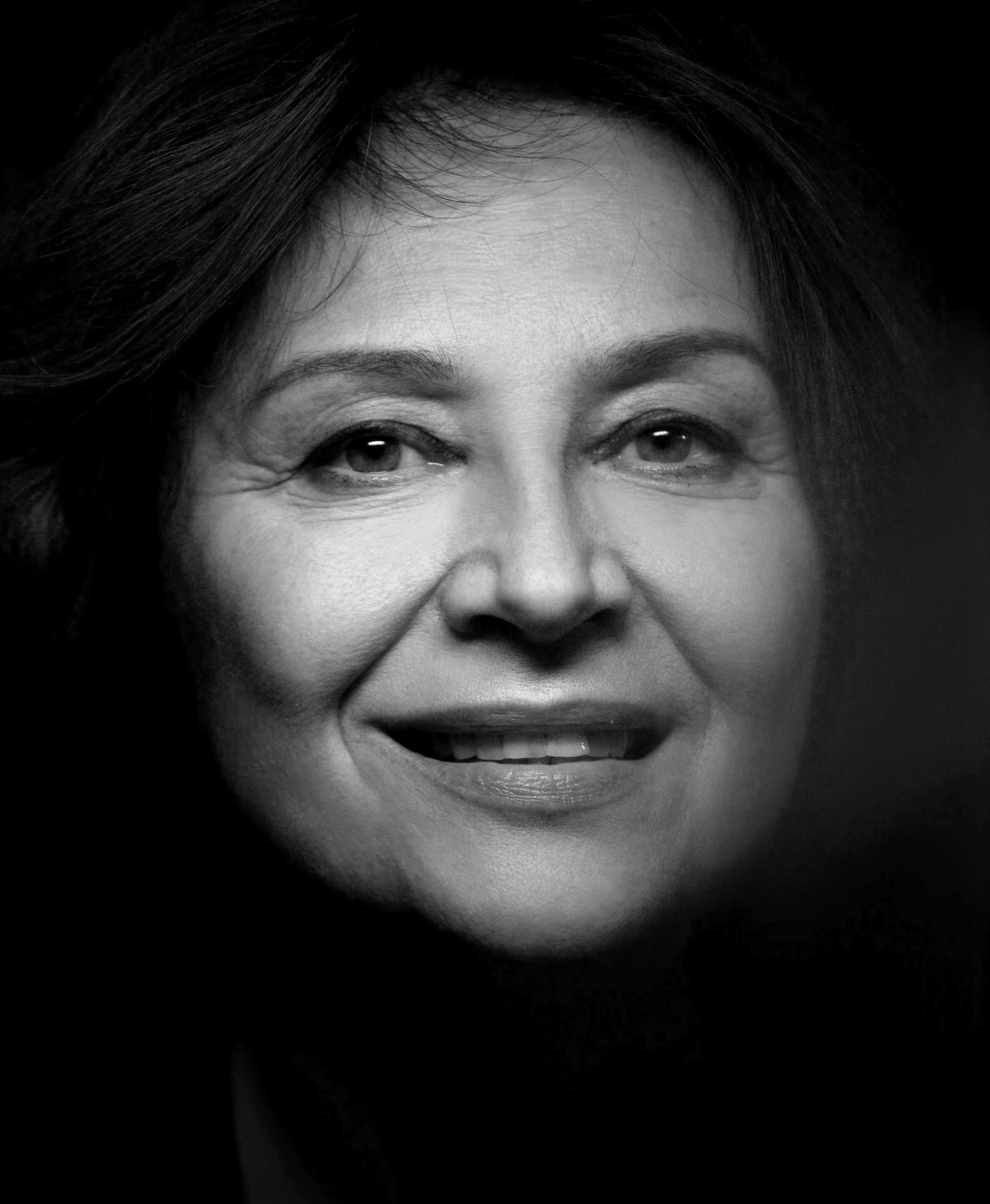
- Vášáryová photographed by Martin Črep
- Occupation: Actress
- Years active: 1958–present

The filmography of Slovak actress Emília Vášáryová consists of forty-two motion pictures, for which she received nine awards as Best Actress in a Leading Role, plus a nomination for a Supporting Role. These include two ZČDU Awards for Who Leaves in the Rain... (1974) and the Lawyer (1977), a ÚV SZŽ Gold Plaque (also for the Lawyer), a Czech Lion award for Up and Down (2004), as well as a Czech Lion nomination for Nasty (2008), a Cinema Award, a SFZ Reward, a ÚSTT Reward, and a Literature Fund Reward (each for Up and Down), and a Golden Goblet award for Václav (2008). Simultaneously, she made one-hundred-thirty-four television films and/or series, earning additional awards (such as a Golden Croc, three Telemuse awards, a Golden Loop, IGRIC, OTO, and/or ELSA). For her work in theater she achieved a Janko Borodáč Award, an Andrej Bagar Award, an Alfréd Radok Award, a Crystal Wing, three Dosky Awards, a Jozef Kroner Award, a Literature Fund award, a Tatra Banka Reward, an award at the To Najlepšie z Humoru Festival, and/or a Komerční banka Award.

== Filmography ==
=== Cinema ===
Year	Title in English	Original title	Director	Production
1950s
1958	St. Peter's Umbrella ^{[A]}	Dáždnik svätého Petra	Vladislav Pavlovič · Frigyes Bán	Hungary · Czechoslovakia
1960s
1960	Marching Is Not Always Fun	Na pochode sa vždy nespieva	František Kudláč	Czechoslovakia
1962	Midnight Mass	Polnočná omša	Jiří Krejčík	Czechoslovakia
1963	Icarus XB-1 ^{[B]}	Ikarie XB-1	Jindřich Polák	Czechoslovakia
1963	The Cassandra Cat ^{[C]}	Až přijde kocour	Vojtěch Jasný	Czechoslovakia
1963	A Face at the Window	Tvár v okne	Peter Solan	Czechoslovakia
1964	The Jester's Tale	Bláznova kronika	Karel Zeman	Czechoslovakia
1965	Exposing Elizabeth Báthory	Odhalenie Alžbety Báthoryčky	Ján Lacko	Czechoslovakia
1965	St. Elizabeth Square	Námestie svätej Alžbety	Vladimír Bahna	Czechoslovakia
1966	Master Executioner	Majster kat	Paľo Bielik	Czechoslovakia
1966	Trailer People	Lidé z maringotek	Martin Frič	Czechoslovakia
1967	The Dragon's Return	Drak sa vracia	Eduard Grečner	Czechoslovakia
1968	There's No Other Way	Niet inej cesty	Jozef Zachar	Czechoslovakia
1970s
1970	The Copper Tower	Medená veža	Martin Hollý, Jr	Czechoslovakia
1973	The Sister Allen's Courtship	Známost sestry Aleny	Miroslav Hubáček	Czechoslovakia
1973	The Case of the Dissolute Beauty	Prípad krásnej nerestnice	Andrej Lettrich	Czechoslovakia
1973	Journey to San Jago	Putovanie do San Jaga	Martin Ťapák	Czechoslovakia
1974	The Day Which Does Not Die	Deň, ktorý neumrie	Martin Ťapák	Czechoslovakia
1974	Who Leaves in the Rain	Kto odchádza v daždi	Martin Hollý, Jr	Czechoslovakia
1976	Red Wine ^{[D]}	Červené víno	Andrej Lettrich	Czechoslovakia
1977	The Lawyer	Advokátka	Andrej Lettrich	Czechoslovakia
1980s
1981	Plavčík and Vratko ^{[E]}	Plavčík a Vratko	Martin Ťapák	Czechoslovakia
1984	About Fame and Grass	O sláve a tráve	Peter Solan	Czechoslovakia
1990s
1995	Hazard	Hazard	Roman Petrenko	Slovakia · Czech Republic
1996	The Higher Power	Vyššia moc	Tomáš Krnáč	Germany · Slovakia
1997	Blue Heaven	Modré z neba	Eva Borušovičová	Slovakia · Czech Republic
1997	Orbis Pictus	Orbis Pictus	Martin Šulík	Slovakia
1999	No Gravity State ^{[F]}	Stav bez tíže	Patrik Hartl	Czech Republic
1999	Cosy Dens	Pelíšky	Jan Hřebejk	Czech Republic
1999	Return to Paradise Lost	Návrat ztraceného ráje	Vojtěch Jasný	Czech Republic · United States
2000s
2001	The Ring	Kruh	Věra Plívová-Šimková · Drahomíra Reňáková-Králová	Czech Republic
2001	Angel Face	Andělská tvář	Zdeněk Troška	Czech Republic
2002	Waterloo on Czech	Waterloo po česku	Vít Olmer	Czech Republic
2003	Bloodlines	Pokrvné vzťahy	Oleg Harenčár	United States · Slovakia · Ukraine
2004	Up and Down	Horem pádem	Jan Hřebejk	Czech Republic
2006	Beauty in Trouble	Kráska v nesnázích	Jan Hřebejk	Czech Republic
2006	I Served the King of England	Obsluhoval jsem anglického krále	Jiří Menzel	Czech Republic · Slovakia
2007	Václav	Václav	Jiří Vejdělek	Czech Republic
2008	Blind Loves (role: audiodescription)	Slepé lásky	Juraj Lehotský	Slovakia
2008	Nasty	Nestyda	Jan Hřebejk	Czech Republic
2010s
2014	Slovensko 2.0	Slovakia 2.0		Slovakia
2015	Eva Nová	Eva Nová	Marko Škop	Slovakia
2016	A Prominent Patient (Masaryk)	Blaženka	Julius Ševčík	Czech Republic · Slovakia
2017	The Line	Anna Krajňáková	Peter Bebjak	Slovakia · Ukraine · Czech Republic
2018	The Dad's Volga	—N/a	Jiří Vejdělek	Czech Republic

Notes

- A In Hungary the film was released under title Szent Péter esernyöje.
- B Released abroad as Voyage to the End of the Universe.
- C Released abroad as That Cat, When the Cat Comes, and The Cat Who Wore Sunglasses.
- D Also released as a two episode TV-series.
- E In the Czech region the film was titled Tři zlaté vlasy děda Vševěda.
- F A short movie.

=== Television ===
Year	Title in English	Original title	Director	Production
1960s
1962	Young Ages	Mladé letá	Ján Klimo	Czechoslovakia
1963	The End's Year Burial Feast	Kar na konci roka	Ivan Teren	Czechoslovakia
1963	The Suit for a Donkey's Shade	Proces o oslí tieň	František Chmiel	Czechoslovakia
1964	The Charley's Aunt	Charleyho teta	Jiří Vrba	Czechoslovakia
1964	Dundo and the Others	Dundo a tí druhí	Jiří Vrba	Czechoslovakia
1964	A Man for Anything	Muž pre každé počasie	Magdalena Lokvencová – Husáková	Czechoslovakia
1965	Eye for Eye	Oko za oko	Jozef Zachar	Czechoslovakia
1965	Jake	Kubo	Martin Ťapák	Czechoslovakia
1966	The Indifferent	Ľahostajní	Juraj Svoboda	Czechoslovakia
1966	Wiredrawer	Drotár	Karol L. Zachar	Czechoslovakia
1966	The Living Scourge ^{[F]}	Živý bič	Martin Ťapák	Czechoslovakia
1967	The Maids of Honor	Dvorné dámy	Tibor Rakovský	Czechoslovakia
1967	The Trap	Pasca	Ivan Balaďa	Czechoslovakia
1967	The Promise	Sľub	Vido Horňák	Czechoslovakia
1967	The Woman's Law	Ženský zákon	Pavol Haspra	Czechoslovakia
1967	The Cuckold	Paroháč	Jiří Vrba	Czechoslovakia
1968	The Young Nurse	Mladá mníška	Jiří Vrba	Czechoslovakia
1968	The Balade for the Seven Hanged	Balada o siedmich obesených	Martin Hollý, Jr	Czechoslovakia
1968	Thanksgiving Adventure	Dobrodružstvo pri obžinkoch	Karol L. Zachar	Czechoslovakia
1968	Dirty Hands	Špinavé ruky	Peter Solan	Czechoslovakia
1968	Mona Lisa Smile	Úsmev Mony Lízy	Bedřich Kramosil	Czechoslovakia
1968	Peter and Lucy	Peter a Lucia	Tibor Rakovský	Czechoslovakia
1970s
1970	Don Quijote Fighting	Don Quijote zvádza boj	Tibor Rakovský	Czechoslovakia
1970	False Nero	Falošný Nero	Vladimír Strnisko	Czechoslovakia
1970	Two People	Dvaja	Igor Ciel	Czechoslovakia
1971	You Talk about Just Love	Hovoríš len o láske	Igor Ciel	Czechoslovakia
1971	Parisian Mohicans ^{[F]}	Parížski mohykáni	Igor Ciel	Czechoslovakia
1971	The Old Tales by Emo Bohun ^{[F]}	Zaprášené histórie Ema Bohúňa	Jozef Zachar	Czechoslovakia
1971	Noodledom	Kocúrkovo	Karol L. Zachar	Czechoslovakia
1972	The Shepherd Wife	Bačova žena	Karol L. Zachar	Czechoslovakia
1972	The Inspector Returns	Inšpektor sa vracia	Igor Ciel	Czechoslovakia
1972	Othello	Othello	Peter Mikulík	Czechoslovakia
1972	Forever Young History	Večne mladá história	František Chmiel	Czechoslovakia
1973	Monna Vanna	Monna Vanna	Juraj Svoboda	Czechoslovakia
1973	Flowers Blooming along the Sidehill	Na úbočiach kvitnú kvety	Ľuba Vančíková	Czechoslovakia
1974	Secret Agent	Tajný agent	Peter Mikulík	Czechoslovakia
1974	The Buddenbrook's ^{[F]}	Buddenbrookovci	Vido Horňák	Czechoslovakia
1974	Impatient Heart	Netrpezlivosť srdca	Miloš Pietor	Czechoslovakia
1974	The Black Lady	Piková dáma	?	Czechoslovakia
1974	Elf	Škriatok	Karol L. Zachar	Czechoslovakia
1974	Victoria Regia	Viktória Régia	Marta Gogálová	Czechoslovakia
1974		Vodník a Zuzana	Jan Schmidt	Czechoslovakia
1974	Eight Women	Osem žien	Peter Mikulík	Czechoslovakia
1975	Kean	Kean	Peter Mikulík	Czechoslovakia
1975	Professor Sonnenbruch	Profesor Sonnenbruch	Ivan Teren	Czechoslovakia
1975	The Rise at Sycamore	Vzbura v ulici Sycamore	Ivan Teren	Czechoslovakia
1975	Pretty Ilina	Krásna Ilina	Peter Hledík	Czechoslovakia
1975	The Shirk	Poškolák	Jaroslav Pogran	Czechoslovakia
1975	The Light from the North	Svetlo severu	Daniel Michaelli	Czechoslovakia
1975	Vivat Benyovszky ^{[F]}^{[G]}	Vivat Beňovský	Igor Ciel	Czechoslovakia · Hungary
1975	The Lion in Love	Zamilovaný lev	Juraj Svoboda	Czechoslovakia
1975	Thirty-nine at Shadow^{[F]}	Tridsaťdeväť stupňov v tieni	Jozef Pálka	Czechoslovakia
1976	The Third Voice	Hlas toho tretieho	Jozef Pálka	Czechoslovakia
1976	Congress in Napoli	Kongres v Neapole	Jozef Pálka	Czechoslovakia
1976	Red Wine^{[H]}	Červené víno	Andrej Lettrich	Czechoslovakia
1976	Mario and Magician	Mário a kúzelník	Miloslav Luther	Czechoslovakia
1976	Left to Live	Odsúdení na život	Peter Mikulík	Czechoslovakia
1976	Blown Away as a Smoke	Odviata ako dym	Marta Gogálová	Czechoslovakia
1976	A Bit of Salt ^{[F]}	Štipku soli	Otakar Krivánek	Czechoslovakia
1976	All the Good Men	Všetci tí čestní muži	Eva Sadková	Czechoslovakia
1976	The Zen Sense	Zenovo vedomie	Vido Horňák	Czechoslovakia
1977	Doctor Jorge	Doktor Jorge	Dušan Hanák	Czechoslovakia
1977	Louis Pasteur ^{[F]}	Louis Pasteur	Igor Ciel	Czechoslovakia
1978	Five Days to Trial	Päť dní do rozsudku	Igor Ciel	Czechoslovakia
1978	Cover Story	Článok na prvú stranu	Miloš Pietor	Czechoslovakia
1978	The Manassas	Muž z Manassasu	Miloš Pietor	Czechoslovakia
1978	Control Stage No. 6 Today	Dnes platí regulačný stupeň č.6	Daniel Michaelli	Czechoslovakia
1978	I Know What I'm Gonna Do	Už viem, čo urobím	Daniel Michaelli	Czechoslovakia
1979	Cousin Bette ^{[F]}	Sesternica Beta	Vido Horňák	Czechoslovakia
1979	The Saturdays Evenings	Sobotné večery	Oľga Rúfusová	Czechoslovakia
1979	The Arny Jurga's Wedding	Svadba Arneho Jurgu	Stanislav Párnický	Czechoslovakia
1979	Morning under the Moon	Ráno pod mesiacom	Miloslav Luther	Czechoslovakia
1980s
1980	Dangerous Liaisons	Nebezpečné známosti	Miloslav Luther	Czechoslovakia
1980	Now, You Decide ^{[F]}	A teraz sa rozhodni	Peter Jezný	Czechoslovakia
1980	Balladyna ^{[F]}	Balladyna	Tadeusz Lis	Czechoslovakia
1980	The Jubels' Kids	Jubelove deti	Igor Ciel	Czechoslovakia
1980	Drawn on the Glass	Na skle maľované	Karol L. Zachar	Czechoslovakia
1980	Breakthrough	Prelom	Ivan Teren	Czechoslovakia
1980	The King's Man Return	Návrat kráľovho muža	Ľubomír Vajdička	Czechoslovakia
1981	Masquarade	Maškaráda	Tibor Rakovský	Czechoslovakia
1981	Nine Years After ^{[I]}	Po deviatich rokoch	Martin Ťapák	Czechoslovakia
1981	Shrewd Widow	Prefíkaná vdova	Július Pántik	Czechoslovakia
1981	A Weird Girl	Čudné dievča	František Chmiel	Czechoslovakia
1982	The poet of Beauty, Truth and Hope	Pevec krásy, pravdy a nádeje	Juraj Svoboda	Czechoslovakia
1982	The Turn of the Screw	The Turn of the Screw	Petr Weigl	Germany
1982	The Thibaults^{[A]}	Thibaultovci	Peter Mikulík	Czechoslovakia
1983	For the Law on Duty^{[A]}	Na stope zločinu: V službách zákona	Karol Spišák · Juraj Svoboda · František Chmiel · Peter Opálený	Czechoslovakia
1984	The Play on Twenty Moves	Mat na dvadsať ťahov	Igor Ciel	Czechoslovakia
1984	Johny's Toys	Jankove hračky	Radim Cvrček	Czechoslovakia
1984	Formidable Affections	Neľahké lásky	Ľubomír Vajdička	Czechoslovakia
1984	Rebel Memoir ^{[F]}	Povstalecká história	Andrej Lettrich	Czechoslovakia
1984	An Episode	Epizóda	Miloš Pietor	Czechoslovakia
1985	Bankinghouse Khuwich and comp.	Bankinghouse Khuwich and comp.	Peter Opálený	Czechoslovakia
1985	Ideal Husband	Ideálny manžel	Peter Mikulík	Czechoslovakia
1985	The Sign ^{[F]}	Materské znamienko	Marta Gogálová	Czechoslovakia
1986	The Elizabeth's Court	Alžbetin dvor ^{[F]}	Andrej Lettrich	Czechoslovakia
1986	Two Ballads	Dve balady	Jozef Bednárik	Czechoslovakia
1986	The Last Stop	Posledná zastávka		Czechoslovakia
1987	The Peacock Feather	Pávie pierko ^{[J]}	Petr Weigl	Germany · Czechoslovakia
1987		Sudca vo vlastnej pasci	Miloš Pietor	Czechoslovakia
1987	Two People	Dvaja	Vladimír Strnisko	Czechoslovakia
1989	Portrait of Dorian Gray ^{[F]}	Portrét Doriana Graya	Vladimír Strnisko	Czechoslovakia
1989	Mercadet	Mercadet	Ľubomír Vajdička	Czechoslovakia
1989	Counting Crows	Rátanie havranov	Radim Cvrček	Czechoslovakia
1989	The Pendulum Troubadors	Trubadúri z pendloviek	Jozefína Šujanová	Czechoslovakia
1989	Six Times Woman	Šesťkrát žena	František Chmiel	Czechoslovakia
1989		Reverend^{[A]}	Miloš Pietor	Czechoslovakia
1989	The Masquerade Ball ^{[I]}	Maškarný ples	Ivan Svetko	Czechoslovakia
1989	The Grey Rose Drama ^{[F]}	Staroružová dráma	Vido Horňák	Czechoslovakia
1990s
1991	Devil in France	Diabol vo Francúzsku	Alois Ditrich	Czechoslovakia
1991	Dido ^{[F]}^{[K]}	Dido	Dušan Rapoš	Germany · Czechoslovakia
1991	Do-Gooder ^{[F]}	Dobrodinec	Ján Zeman	Czechoslovakia
1991	Lorenzaccio ^{[F]}	Lorenzaccio	Miloslav Luther	Czechoslovakia
1991	The Variations of Fame	Variácie slávy	Miroslav Sobota	Czechoslovakia
1991	La Musica	La Musica		Czechoslovakia
1991	Mother of Jesus	Ježišova matka	Jozef Bednárik	Czechoslovakia
1992	The Aunt Roe Tells^{[I]}	Čo rozprávala teta Srna		
1992	Europe, My Love	Európa, moja láska	Vido Horňák	Czechoslovakia
1992	From the Morning to Sunrise	Od rána do úsvitu	Ľubo Kocka	Czechoslovakia
1993	The Betrayed Brother	Le frère trahi	Philippe Monnier	France
1993	The Wasteland of Love	Pustatina lásky	Stanislav Párnický	Slovakia, France
1994	About the Johnny Key	O Jankovi kľúčiarovi	Igor Kováč	Slovakia
1994	Playing Tonight^{[A]}	Dnes večer hrám ja	Ľubomír Vajdička	Slovakia
1995	Little Big Prince	Malý veľký princ	Libor Vaculík	Slovakia
1998	The Remembered Ami ^{[L]}	Aminina pamiatka	Roman Polák	Hungary · Slovakia
1999	The Cage	Klietka	Stanislav Párnický	Slovakia
1999	Variations^{[A]}	Variácie	Yvonne Vavrová	Slovakia
2000s
2007	The Consulting Room at Pink Garden ^{[M]}	Ordinácia v ružovej záhrade	Various	Slovakia
2008	Private Hooks ^{[F]}	Soukromé pasti	Milan Cieslar · Dan Wlodarczyk · Lenka Wimmerová · Petr Slavík · Petr Zahrádka · Tereza Kopáčová · Martin Dolenský	Czech Republic
2009	The Archive	Archiv	Lucie Bělohradská	Czech Republic
2010s
2010	The Old Town's Crime Stories ^{[F]}	Kriminálka Staré Mesto	Ján Sebechlebský	Slovakia · Czech Republic
2011	Filmtales: "All Souls' Day of Seniors"^{[F]}	Filmoviedky: "Dušičky seniorov"	Stanislav Párnický	Slovakia
2014	Picnic	Piknik	Hynek Bočan	Czech Republic
2015	Doktor Martin^{[A]} (in post-production)	Doctor Martin	Petr Zahrádka	Czech Republic

Notes

- F A TV series.
- G In Hungary the film was titled Vivát, Benyovszky!
- H The work was screened in cinema as a movie.
- I A short film.
- J In Germany the movie was entitled Die Pfauenfeder.
- K In Germany the film was released as Dido – Das Geheimnis des Fisches.
- L In Hungary the work was entitled Amine emlékezete.
- M A soap opera.

== See also ==
- Emília Vášáryová awards and nominations
- List of Academy Award winners and nominees for Best Foreign Language Film
- List of Czech submissions for the Academy Award for Best Foreign Language Film
- Golden Goblet Award for Best Actress
- List of winners of Alfréd Radok Awards
