= Ambalabe =

Ambalabe may refer to one of the following locations in Madagascar:

- Ambalabe, Antalaha in Antalaha District, Sava Region
- Ambalabe, Vatomandry in Vatomandry District, Atsinanana Region

== See also ==
- Ambalabe Befanjava in Mahajanga II District, Boeny Region
