= Eva Krížiková filmography =

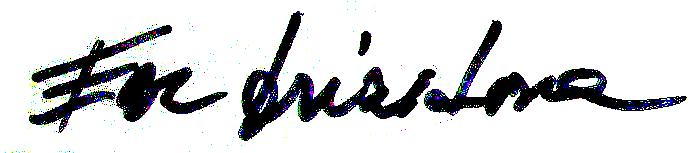
- Film: 18
- Television film: 92
- Television series: 31
- Others: 13

The filmography of Eva Krížiková chronicles her film work through the artist's 60 years as a motion picture actress. She initially entered the film industry through a minor, backup role in Paľo Bielik's work The Mountains Are Stirring from 1952. Her first starring role came shortly after that, in Friday the 13th (1953), also by Bielik. However Krížiková has been cast in only eighteen feature films in total, her name has been credited in over 500 productions made for television, 123 of which represent TV films and/or series.

== Filmography ==
=== Feature films ===
Year	Title	Role	Notes
Black-and-white films
1952	The Mountains Are Stirring^{+}	Bar girl	CS, drama, 99 min; dir. Paľo Bielik. As backup actor.
1953	Friday the 13th	Olga Rebro, sailor in closet	SR, comedy, 94 min; dir. Paľo Bielik. First credited role.
1955	The Quadrille	Darinka	SR, comedy, 84 min; dir. Jozef Medveď/Karol Krška.
1956	The Devil Never Sleeps	Olinka, secretary	CS, comedy, 95 min dir. Peter Solan/František Žáček. She appears in episode "True-to-type Case".
1958	Honest Thief	Vierka	SR, comedy, 73 min; dir. Ján Lacko.
1959	Captain Dabac	Anca, Borik's grandchild	SR, war drama, 100 min; dir. Paľo Bielik.
1960	Marching Is Not Always Fun	Ms Kadarka	SR, tragedy, 81 min; dir. František Kudláč.
1965	Death Comes in Rain	Mistress of Mr Holes	SR, mystery film, 91 min. The first installment of a crime anthology series directed by Andrej Lettrich, followed by The Killer from the Beyond (1966) and Calling Demons (1967).
1973	Heart on a Rope	Ms Sedlak	SSR, drama, 82 min; dir. Otakar Krivánek.
Color motion pictures
1976	Red Wine	Filomena	SSR, drama, 154 min; dir. Andrej Lettrich. Based on a 1972 three-episode TV series of the same name/maker.
1976	Watch Out, Josephine's Coming...	Stefa	SSR, comedy, 78 min; dir. Jozef Režucha.
1977	Raca - My Love	Darina's mother	SSR/GE/USSR, musical comedy, 81 min; dir. Jozef Medveď and Timur Palavandišvili.: Život Award — Most Favorite Actress.
1977	The Squirrel Friend	Ms Hronec	SSR, children's film, 74 min; dir. Jozef Zachar.
1982	Summer Has Come Too Early	Professor of Maths	SSR, drama, 83 min; dir. Otakar Krivánek.
1984	The Wizard's Return	Ms Strejca	CSR, drama, 95 min; dir. Antonín Kachlík. Her part dubbed into Czech language Míla Myslíková.
1989	Freelance	Ms Vichnar	CSFR, musical comedy, 91 min; dir. Julius Matula. Bilingual-language film, produced by Czech Barrandov.
1994	In the Coat of Lioness' Arms (aka Zdislava of Lemberk)	Madalena	CR, historical drama, 93 min; dir. Ludvík Ráža. Her only role performed exclusively in Czech.
1996	Suzanne	Old Anca	SR/CR, drama, 130 min; dir. Dušan Rapoš. Her only cameo on the screen following the Velvet Divorce in basically a Slovak-speaking film, co-produced by ČNTS.
^{+} denotes an uncredited performance.

== Television ==
=== TV films ===
Year	Title	Role	Notes
1963	The Trial of the Donkey's Shadow	—N/a	SSR, comedy, 81 min; dir. František Chmiel. Based on a novel by Friedrich Dürrenmatt.
1964	The Sunny Bath	—N/a	SSR, comedy, 40 min; dir. Vladimír Bahna. Based on a short story by Janko Jesenský.
1966	The Indifferent	—N/a	SSR, drama, 69 min; dir. Juraj Svoboda. Based on a novel by Albert Moravia.
1966	The Wireman	—N/a	SSR, comedy, 74 min; dir. Karol L. Zachar. Based on a novel by Ján Palárik.
1968	The Novel about a Contrabass	—N/a	SSR, comedy-drama, 40 min; dir. Vido Horňák. Based on a short story by Anton Chekhov.
1969	Volpone	—N/a	SSR, drama, 85 min; dir. František Dibarbora. Based on a story adapted by Stefan Zweig.
1969	The Ostrich Party	—N/a	SSR, drama, 70 min; dir. Július Pántik. Based on a story by Ivan Bukovčan.
1971	Jealous Women	—N/a	SSR, comedy, 65 min; dir. Oto Katuša. Based on a story by Carlo Goldoni.
1971	The Magical Drink	—N/a	SSR, fairy tale, 50 min; dir. Peter Opálený. Based on a story by Pavol Dobšinský.
1971	Birbal and Conspirators	—N/a	SSR, fairy tale, 62 min; dir. Zora Bachnárová.
1972	Jealousy	—N/a	SSR, comedy, 68 min; dir. František Chmiel. Based on a story by Krista Bendová.
1972	The Dress	—N/a	SSR, comedy, 59 min; dir. Radim Cvrček.
1972	The Wild Duck	—N/a	SSR, drama, 90 min; dir. Pavol Haspra. Based on the same-titled play by Henrik Ibsen.
1974	Stopka and Bodkin	—N/a	SSR, fairy tale, 52 min; dir. Ivan Krajíček.
1974	The Unlucky Man	—N/a	SSR, comedy, 45 min; dir. Jozef Pálka. Based on a short story by Janko Jesenský.
1974	The Jarikov Church	—N/a	SSR, comedy, 41 min; dir. Pavol Haspra. Based on a story by Ladislav Nádaši-Jégé.
1974	Tricker Stopka	—N/a	SSR, 53 min; dir. Ivan Krajíček. Based on a story by Anton Chekhov.
1975	Meridian	—N/a	SSR, drama, 89 min; dir. Pavol Haspra.
1975	The Silver Jaguar	—N/a	SSR, drama, 113 min; dir. Peter Opálený. A follow-up of Meridian (1972).
1975	The Revenge	—N/a	SSR, comedy, 70 min; dir. Ján Roháč. Based on a story by Krista Bendová.
1975	The Secular Beauty	—N/a	SSR, fairy tale, 70 min; dir. Zora Bachnárová. Based on a story by Pavol Dobšinský.
1975	The Lion in Love	—N/a	SSR, drama, 85 min; dir. Juraj Svoboda. Based on a play by Shelagh Delaney.
1976	The Last Shot	—N/a	SSR, drama, 80 min; dir. Marta Gogálová.
1976	The Four Boors	—N/a	SSR, comedy, 70 min; dir. Karol L. Zachar. Based on a play by Carlo Goldoni.
1976	The Vincent's Pipe	—N/a	SSR, comedy, 40 min; dir. Ivan Petrovický. Based on a story by Ľudo Zelienka.
1976	Zypa Cupak	—N/a	SSR, comedy, 70 min; dir. Jozef Medveď. Based on a novel by Ján Čajak Jr.
1976	The Angel Comes Through the Window	Ms Jakubec, social care assistant	SSR, drama, 80 min; dir. Marta Gogálová.
1977	The Pants	—N/a	SSR, comedy, 40 min; dir. Oto Katuša. Based on a story by Gustáv Kazimír Zechenter-Laskomerský.
1977	The Married Alive	—N/a	SSR, comedy, 50 min; dir. Miloš Pietor.
1977	The Brave Stephan	—N/a	SSR, fairy tale, 59 min; dir. Zora Bachnárová. Based on an Ural story.
1977	Golden Chain	—N/a	SSR, drama; dir. Pavol Haspra.
1977	The Grey Hair of Dr. Hondak	—N/a	SSR, comedy musical, 105 min; dir. Otakar Krivánek.
1978	The Soul of the Society	—N/a	SSR, comedy, 33 min; dir. Jozef Pálka.
1978	Gabor Vlkolinsky	—N/a	SSR, drama, 70 min; dir. Jozef Pálka. Based on a novel by Pavol Országh Hviezdoslav.
1978	About a Nosy Cook and a Leggy Wireman	—N/a	SSR, fairy tale, 85 min; dir. Viliam Gräffinger.
1978	Uncle's Dream	—N/a	SSR, comedy drama, 89 min; dir. Miloš Pietor. Based on the novella by Fyodor Dostoyevsky.
1978	Cholera, They Say	—N/a	SSR, comedy, Karol Spišák. Based on a play by Ján Čajak.
1979	The Fight for Van Gogh	—N/a	SSR, comedy, 36 min; dir. Ivan Krajíček.
1979	Eugene Onegin	—N/a	SSR, drama, 96 min; dir. Marta Gogálová. Based on a novel by Alexander Pushkin.
1979	The Camel Ass	—N/a	SSR, comedy, 62 min; dir. Peter Mikulík.
1979	No Big Words	—N/a	SSR, drama, 60 min; dir. Marta Gogálová.
1980	What You Borrow Is What You Give Back	—N/a	SSR, comedy, 30 min; dir. Jozef Pálka. Based on a story by Ladislav Nádaši-Jégé.
1980	The Witch'es Great-Granddaughter	—N/a	SSR, fairy tale, 50 min; dir. Zora Bachnárová.
1980	Watch Out for Angels	—N/a	SSR, comedy drama, 72 min; dir. Miloš Pietor. Based on a play by Ján Solovič.
1980	The Grandmother's Recipe	—N/a	SSR, comedy, 40 min; dir. Jozef Pálka.
1980	Saturday, Sunday, Monday	—N/a	SSR, comedy, 75 min; dir. Peter Mikulík. Based on a
1981	The Pure Waters	—N/a	SSR, drama, 50 min; dir. Jozef Pálka.
1981	Joe-Ass	—N/a	SSR, musical, 62 min; dir. Lucia Šebová.
1981	Two Single with No Children	—N/a	SSR, comedy, 57 min; dir. Zora Bachnárová.
1981	Katera	—N/a	SSR, drama, 64 min; dir. Martin Ťapák. Based on a story by Timrava.
1981	Two Admirers	—N/a	SSR, comedy, 75 min; dir. Ivan Krajíček.
1981	Not An Ordinary Day	—N/a	SSR, musical, 67 min; dir. Karol Spišák.
1981	The Shrewd Widow	—N/a	SSR, comedy, 85 min; dir. Július Pántik. Based on a play by Carlo Goldoni.
1981	The Sokoliars' Daughter	—N/a	SSR, fairy tale, 72 min; dir. Jozef Pálka. Based on a story by Jozef Horák.
1981	Victoria in the Early Fall	—N/a	SSR, drama, 56 min; dir. Jozef Pálka.
1982	How Get Unmarried	—N/a	SSR, comedy, 45 min; dir. Pavol Haspra. Based on a book by Fan Vavřincová.
1982	Fight, Mr. Jedlinsky!	—N/a	SSR, comedy, 50 min; dir. Miloš Pietor. Based on play St. Florian's Little Boots by Ladislav Nádaši-Jégé.
1982	The Chronicle	—N/a	SSR, drama, 55 min; dir. Zora Bachnárová.
1982	Labula	—N/a	SSR, musical, 50 min; dir. Karol Spišák.
1982	The Upward Fall	—N/a	SSR, drama, 66 min; dir. Cyril Valšík.
1982	The Three-clan Nerve	—N/a	SSR, comedy, 40 min; dir. Jozef Pálka.
1982	The Golden Virgin and The Curse Brother	—N/a	SSR, fairy tale, 55 min; dir. Zora Bachnárová.
1983	What Has Happened in a Little Cinema	—N/a	SSR, comedy, 65 min; dir. Cyril Králik.
1983	The Leaky Pocket	—N/a	SSR, musical fairy tale, 49 min; dir. Cyril Králik.
1983	The Double Life of Dr. Sel	—N/a	SSR, comedy, 35 min; dir. Miloš Pietor.
1983	Joey Pucik and His Career	—N/a	SSR, comedy, 82 min; dir. Peter Opálený. Based on a play by Ivan Stodola.
1983	The King of Fairy Tales	—N/a	SSR, fairy tale, 85 min; dir. Ján Chlebík. Based on a life of Hans Christian Andersen, featuring a sequence of The Emperor's New Clothes
1983	The Wedding Will Be Held	—N/a	SSR, comedy musical, 30 min; dir. Martin Hoffmeister.
1984	The Granddad's Coffer	—N/a	SSR, comedy, 55 min; dir. Miloš Pietor.
1984	When A Jubilee Man Cries	—N/a	SSR, comedy, 83 min; dir. Peter Opálený. Based on a play by Ivan Stodola.
1984	Kura	—N/a	SSR, drama, 55 min; dir. Juraj Svoboda.
1984	The Elbowchin	—N/a	SSR, fairy tale, 70 min; dir. Zora Bachnárová.
1984	The Armload of Air	—N/a	SSR, comedy, 44 min; dir. Peter Opálený.
1984	Once in Our Little Town	—N/a	SSR, comedy, 73 min; dir. Peter Opálený. Based on a story by Ján Hrušovský.
1986	The Beloved Célimare	—N/a	SSR, comedy musical, 54 min; dir. Ľubo Kocka. Based on a play by Eugène Marin Labiche.
1986	The Farewell with Maria	—N/a	SSR, comedy drama, 78 min; dir. Marta Gogálová. Based on a short story by Milan Zelinka.
1986	The Rivals	—N/a	SSR, comedy, 91 min; dir. Miloš Pietor. Based on a play by Richard Brinsley Sheridan.
1987	Patch by Patch	—N/a	SSR, fairy tale, 30 min; dir. Cyril Králik.
1987	The Female Principle	—N/a	SSR, comedy, 85 min; dir. Pavol Haspra. Based on a play by Jozef Gregor-Tajovský.
1988	English	—N/a	SSR, comedy, 30 min; dir. Karol Strážnický.
1989	The Night Singing	—N/a	SSR, drama, 55 min; dir. Oleg Makara-Kalmáry.
1990	The Duel	—N/a	CSFR, drama, 55 min; dir. Peter Opálený. Based on a story by Ivan Vazov.
1990	When the Shepherdy from Chocholov Dies	—N/a	CSFR, comedy drama, 60 min; dir. Pavol Haspra. Based on a story by Martin Kukučín.
1991	The Terminal Valley	—N/a	CSFR, drama, 85 min; dir. Jozef Banyák.
1991	The Fat Pot	Mahuliena Babik	CSFR, comedy, 77 min; dir. Pavol Haspra. Based on a story by Július Barč-Ivan.
1992	The Abandoned	—N/a	CSFR, drama, 78 min; dir. Karol L. Zachar. Based on the self-named story by Jonáš Záborský.
1992	The Café Lyre	—N/a	CSFR, drama, 50 min; dir. Jozef Bednárik. Based on two stories by Dobroslav Chrobák.
1992	About Three Hairpin Turns	—N/a	CSFR, fairy tale, 45 min; dir. Cyril Králik.
1993	Three Short Stories with Karol Machota	—N/a	CSFR, comedy, 65 min; dir. Ľubomír Vajdička. Features The Death of An Old Bachelor, The Event and The Tight Tailcoat.
1995	The Giggling Princess	—N/a	SR, fairy tale, 57 min; dir. Cyril Králik.
1996	The Jubilee	Nastasja Fjodorovna Merchutkin	CR, comedy, 53 min; dir. Vladimír Strnisko. Based on a story by Chekhov. Produced by ČT Brno and in Czech.
1996	Female Wit	—N/a	SR, comedy, 68 min; dir. Jozef Banyák.

=== TV series ===
Year	Title	Role	Notes
1971	The Old Tales by Emo Bohun	—N/a	SSR, 9 episodes; dir. Jozef Zachar. Based on a memoirs by Emil Bohúň.
1972	Nobody's at Home	—N/a	SSR, 15 miniepisodes; dir. Josef Pinkava and Zdeněk Zydroň.
1972	The Fanciers	—N/a	SSR, 3 episodes; dir. Ivan Petrovický.
1972	Red Wine	Filomena	SSR, 3 episodes; dir. Andrej Lettrich. Based on a novel by František Hečko.
1974	The Chronicle	—N/a	SSR, 2 episodes; dir. Ivan Teren. Based on a story by Peter Jilemnický.
1975	39°C in the Shadow	—N/a	SSR, 5 episodes; dir. Jozef Pálka. Based on a novel by Osvald Zahradník.
1975	The Summer with Kate	—N/a	SSR, 7 episodes; dir. Radim Cvrček and Jaromír Roštínský.
1977	A Little of Salt	Klara Srnka	SSR, 3 episodes; dir. Otakar Krivánek. Bilingual-language series, written by Eva Krivánková.
1977	Journalistic Tales	—N/a	SSR, 42 miniepisodes; dir. Miroslav Sobota and Emil Fornay.
1978	The Good People Are Still Alive	Old Ms Dobrík	SSR, 3 episodes; dir. Peter Opálený. Based on a story by Ján Solovič.
1978	Welcome, Suzie! — Goodbye, Suzie!	—N/a	SSR, 2 episodes; dir. Ivan Húšťava. Based on a book series by Hana Zelinová.
1978	Long Live, Grandpa	—N/a	SSR, 7 episodes; dir. Jozef Medveď.
1978	Postman Labus	—N/a	SSR, 3 episodes; dir. Peter Opálený.
1979	Dad, Mum and Me	—N/a	SSR, 8 episodes; dir. Jaroslav Pogran.
1979	The Haliganda Land	—N/a	SSR, 4 episodes; dir. Lucia Šebová.
1980	The Wedding with No Bride	—N/a	SSR, 4 episodes; dir. Pavol Haspra. Based on a novel by Milan Ferko.
1980	Bachelors	—N/a	SSR, 1 episode; dir. Karol Strážnický, Juraj Takáč and Juraj Lihosit.
1980	There Was a Fellow Travelling the World	—N/a	SSR, 3 episodes; dir. Jozef Chudík.
1981	The Lost Tune	—N/a	SSR, 7 episodes; dir. Miroslav Sobota.
1981	Rembrandt van Rijn	—N/a	SSR, 2 episodes; dir. Miloš Pietor. Based on the life of the Dutch painter.
1982	Upon the Fear Advise	—N/a	SSR, 3 episodes; dir. Ľubo Kocka. Based on stories by Ladislav Nádaši-Jégé.
1984	Inventions by the Clockmaker Aurel	—N/a	SSR, 5 episodes; dir. Jozef Chudík.
1984	The 15 Sisters Tales	—N/a	SSR, 16 episodes; dir. Ľuba Vančíková, Zora Bachnárová, Ján Chlebík, Stephen Earnhart, Cyril Králik and Ivan Petrovický.
1987	Those Muddling Waters of Tajov	—N/a	SSR, 3 episodes; dir. Pavol Haspra. Based on the life story of Jozef Gregor-Tajovský.
1989	The Little Devils	—N/a	SSR, 2 episodes; dir. Radim Cvrček.
1991	Dido	—N/a	SSR/DE, 3 episodes; dir. Dušan Rapoš. Based on The Night of Wandering Birds (1983) by Eva Rechlin.
1993	The Musical Tales	—N/a	SR, 3 episodes; dir. Jozef Bednárik. Based on folk fairy tales.
1993	Me, Performing Tonight	—N/a	SSR, 4 episodes (1993-95); dir. Ľubomír Vajdička and Peter Opálený. Among other based on short stories by O. Henry (The Ghost) and Tolstoy (The Actress).
1996	Bubu and Filip	—N/a	CR, 6 episodes; dir. Milan Šteindler. Written by Miloš Macourek, Jindřich Polák and Halina Pawlowská.
1998	Behind the City Walls	—N/a	SR, 4 episodes; dir. Ľuba Vančíková.
2008	The Business with Happiness	—N/a	SR, 54 episodes; dir. Gejza Dezorz. Written by Zuzana Liová, produced by STV.

== Other appearances ==
=== Voice acting roles ===
Year	Title	Role	Notes
1968	The Man Who Lies^{+}	Maria (performed by Sylvia Bréal)	FR/SSR, war drama, 93 min; dir. Alain Robbe-Grillet.
1968	The Sweet Time of Kalimagdora^{+}	Liza (performed by Ildikó Pécsi)	FRG/CSSR, fantasy film, 101 min; dir. Leopold Lahola. Based on a 1937 novel by Jan Weiss.
1974	The Water Goblin and Susanne	Susanne's mother-in-law (performed by Eva Svobodová)	SSR, TV fairy tale, 40 min; dir. Jan Schmidt. Based on a story by Mária Ďuríčková, produced by KF Praha.
1976	The Little Elephant Among Little Animals	—N/a	SSR, TV puppetoon series of 2 episodes; dir. Ladislav Füleky.
1978	Little Golden Feathers	Mean housewife (performed by a puppet)	SSR, TV puppetoon, 30 min; dir. Lucia Šebová. Based on a children's story by Magdaléna Glasnerová.
1978	Restless Little Cat	—N/a	SSR, TV puppetoon, 26 min; dir. Ladislav Füleky.
1979	Lady Friends^{+}	Ms Vondra (performed by H. Růžičková)	SSR, drama, 78 min; dir. Štefan Uher.
1983	Thumbelina	Old field mouse (performed by a puppet)	SSR, TV/puppetoon, 55 min; dir. Lucia Šebová. Based on a fairy tale by Hans Christian Andersen; co-produced by KF Studio Prométheus Ostrava.
1985	The Feather Fairy (aka Lady Winter)^{+}	Perinbaba (performed by G. Masina)	SSR/AT/DE, romantic fantasy, 90 min; dir. Juraj Jakubisko.
^{+} denotes an uncredited performance.

=== Televised theater ===
Year	Title	Role	Notes
1978	Whizzes	—N/a	SSR, 109 min; dir. Jozef Budský and Zlatica Buzgovičová. Based on a play by Ladislav Stroupežnický.
1985	The Old Good Band	Hermina	SSR, drama, 145 min; dir. Pavol Haspra. Based on a play/film by Jiří Hubač, The Green Raspberries (1981).
1992	The Chaos	—N/a	CSFR, drama, 115 min; dir. Juraj Nvota. Based on a play by Leo Birinski.
2007	Cat on a Hot Tin Roof	—N/a	SR, drama, 140 min; dir. Martin Kákoš. Based on a play by Tennessee Williams.
