= Maurice Benyovszky =

Hungarian traveller and writer (1746–1786)

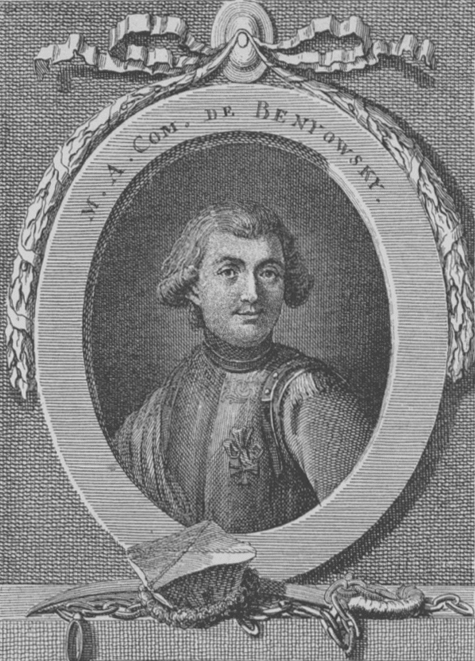
- Portrait of Benyovszky
- Born: 20 September 1746; Verbó, Kingdom of Hungary (present-day Vrbové, Slovakia)
- Died: 23 or 24 May 1786 (aged 39); Angonsty, Kingdom of Imerina (present-day Madagascar)
- Citizenship: Kingdom of Hungary
- Children: Samuel, Charles, Zsuzsanna, Zsofia
- Parents: Sámuel Benyovszky (father); Anna Rozália Révay (mother)
- Awards: Order of Saint Louis

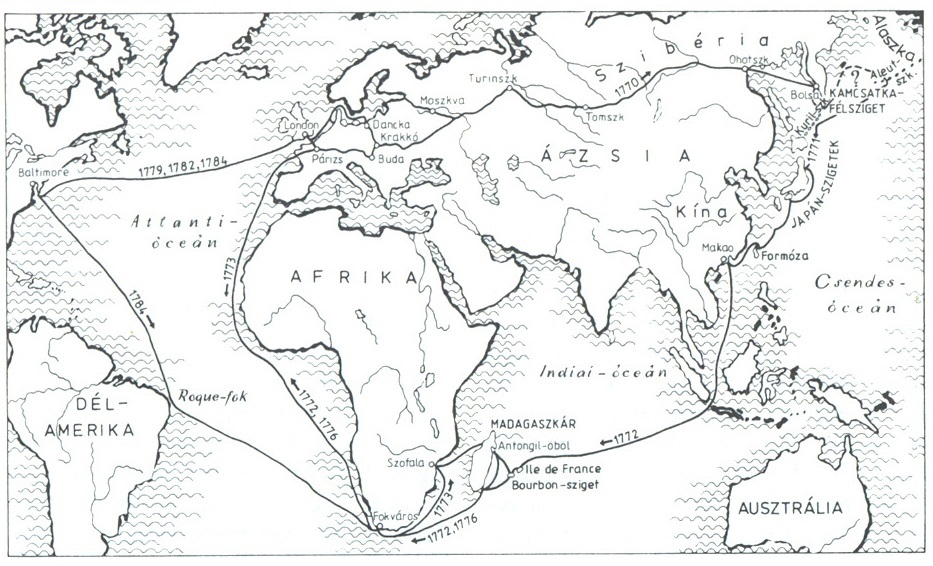
Maurice Benyovszky's journeys

Count Maurice Benyovszky de Benyó et Urbanó (Hungarian: Benyovszky Máté Móric Mihály Ferenc Szerafin Ágost; Polish: Maurycy Beniowski; Slovak: Móric Beňovský; 20 September 1746 – 24 May 1786) was a military officer, adventurer and traveller, and writer from the Kingdom of Hungary, who described himself as both a Hungarian and a Pole. He is considered a national hero in Hungary, Poland, and Slovakia.

Benyovszky was born and raised in Verbó, Kingdom of Hungary (present-day Vrbové, Slovakia). In 1769, while fighting for the Polish armies under the Bar Confederation, he was captured by the Russians and exiled to Kamchatka. He subsequently escaped and returned to Europe via Macau and Mauritius, arriving in France. In 1773, Benyovszky reached agreement with the French government to establish a trading post on Madagascar. Facing significant problems with the climate, the terrain, and the native Sakalava people, he abandoned the trading post in 1776.

Benyovszky then returned to Europe, joined the Austrian Army and fought in the War of the Bavarian Succession. After a failed venture in Fiume (present-day Rijeka), he travelled to America and obtained financial backing for a second voyage to Madagascar. The French governor of Mauritius sent a small armed force to close down his operation, and Benyovszky was killed in May 1786.

In 1790, Benyovszky's posthumous and largely fictitious account of his adventures, entitled Memoirs and Travels of Mauritius Augustus Count de Benyowsky, Volume 1 and Volume 2 was published to great success.

His fate fascinated authors in the 19th and 20th centuries. His destiny became the inspiration for numerous plays, novels, and poems.

== Biography ==
Benyovszky's autobiographical Memoirs of 1790 makes many claims about his life. Critics from 1790 onwards have shown that many of these are either false or are highly questionable. Not the least is Benyovszky's opening statement that he was born in 1741, rather than 1746 – a birth-date which allowed him to claim having fought in the Seven Years' War with the rank of lieutenant and having studied navigation.

In old sources he is considered to be Hungarian, Pole, or even French.

=== Early years ===
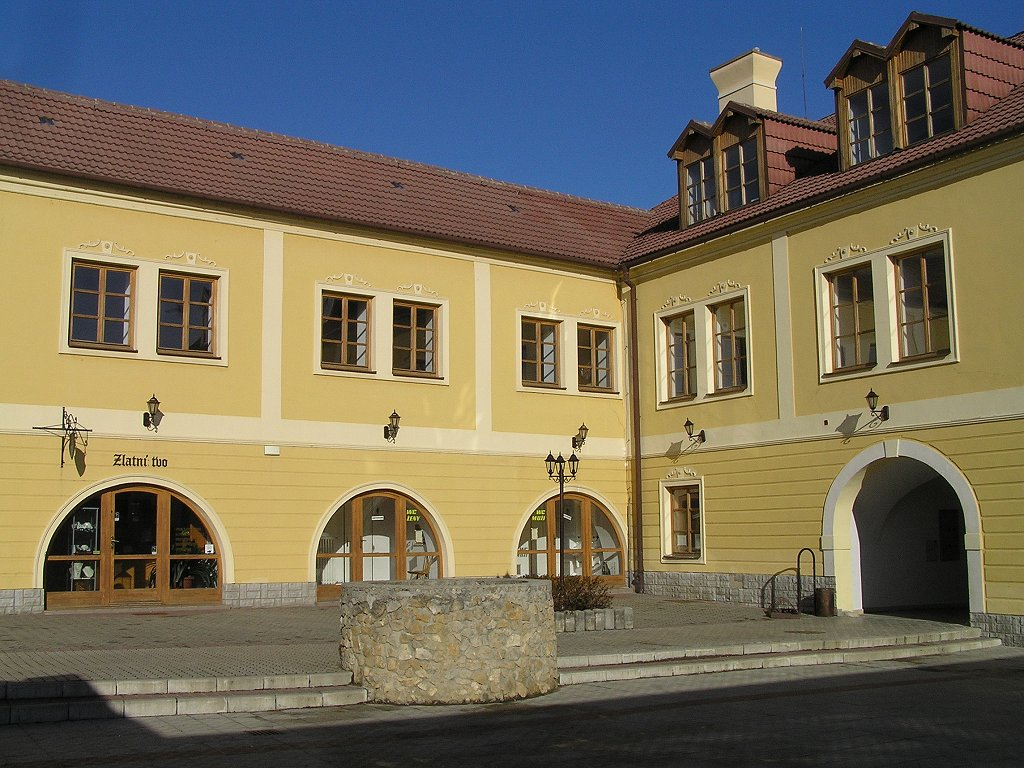
Benyowsky family home in Verbó (now: Vrbové)

Maurice Benyovszky was born on 20 September 1746 in the town of Verbó in the Kingdom of Hungary (present-day Vrbové near Trnava, Slovakia) in an old noble family. He was baptised under the Latin names Mattheus Mauritius Michal Franciscus Seraphinus (Hungarian: Máté Móric Mihály Ferenc Szerafin). The additional name Augustus (Ágost) may also have been given, but this is not clear on his baptismal record.

Maurice was the son of Sámuel Benyovszky, who came from Turóc County in the Kingdom of Hungary (today partially Turiec region, in present-day Slovakia) and served as a colonel in the Hussars of the Austrian Army. His mother, Rozália Révay, was the daughter of a baron from the noble Hungarian Révay family; she was the great-granddaughter of Péter Révay, and the daughter of Count Boldizsár Révay de Szklabina. When she married Sámuel Benyovszky, she was the widow of an army general (Josef Pestvarmegyey, d.1743)

Maurice was the eldest of eleven children born to Sámuel and Rozália: only three of his siblings survived to adulthood: a sister, Márta (1749–1825), and two brothers, Ferenc (1753–c. 1789) and Emánuel (1754–1799). Both brothers followed military careers. In addition, there were three step-sisters and one step-brother, born to Rozália from her previous marriage – Theresia (1735–1763), Anna (b. pre-1743), Borbála (b. 1740), and Peter (b. 1743)

Maurice spent his childhood in the Benyovszky mansion in Verbó and studied from 1759 to 1760 at the Piarist College in Szentgyörgy (present-day Svätý Jur), a suburb of Pressburg (present-day Bratislava). When both his parents died in 1760, the family home and estate was the subject of litigation between the two sets of siblings.

His mother tongue was Hungarian. Though no birth records have survived, his name in the records of the Szentgyörgy college appeared as a Hungarian nobleman, but for unknown reasons the following year's data were re-written to Slovak with a different handwriting.

=== Marriage and military service ===
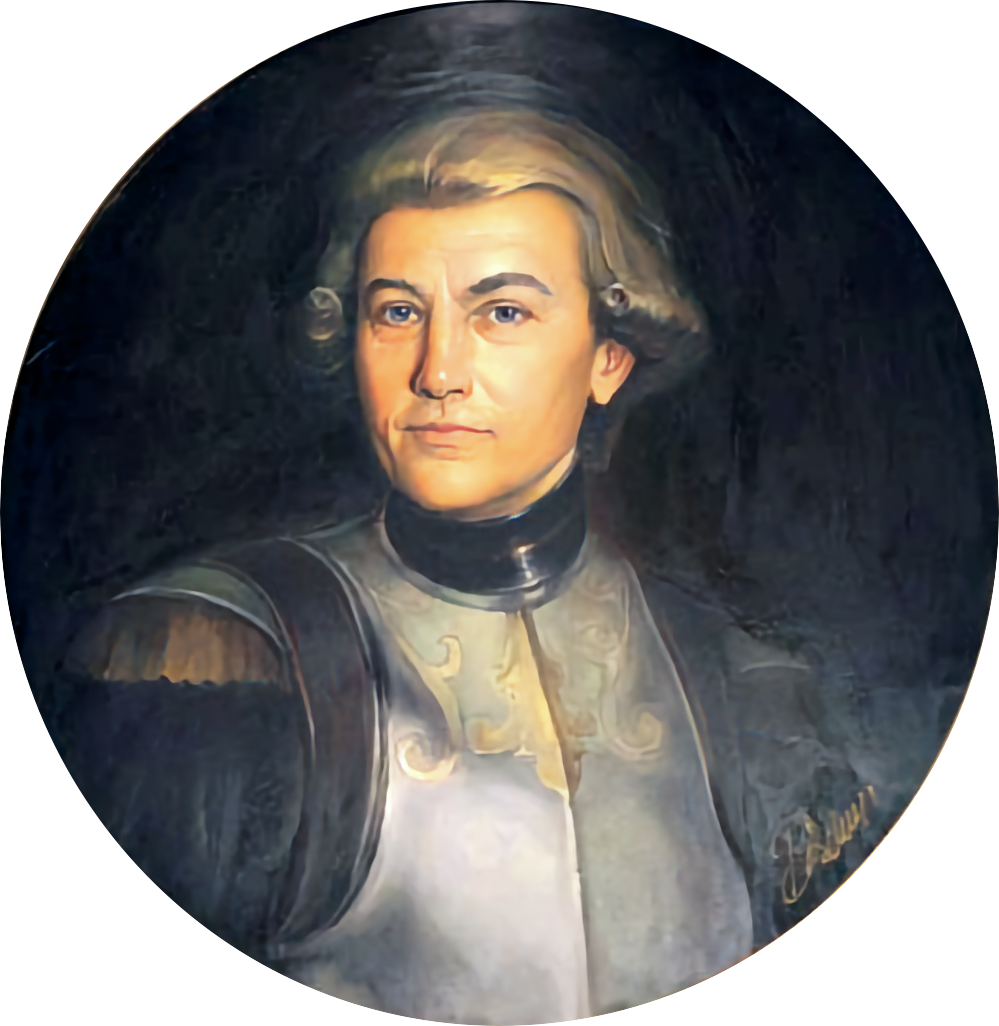
Portrait of Maurice wearing armour

In 1765 Benyovszky occupied his mother's property in Hrusó (present-day Hrušové) near Verbó, which had been legally inherited by one of his step-brothers-in-law. This action led his mother's family to file a criminal complaint against him, and he was called to stand trial in Nyitra (present-day Nitra). Before the conclusion of the trial, Benyovszky fled to Poland to join his uncle, Jan Tibor Benyowski de Benyo, a Polish nobleman. His flight violated a legal edict forbidding him to leave the country.

He was arrested in July 1768 in Szepesszombat (present-day Spišská Sobota), a suburb of Poprád (present-day Poprad) in the house of a German butcher named Hönsch for trying to organize a Confederation of Bar militia. Shortly after his arrest, Benyovszky was briefly imprisoned in the nearby Stará Ľubovňa castle. At around this time, he married the daughter of this butcher, Anna Zusanna Hönsch (1750–1826). A child, Samuel, was born to this marriage on 9 December 1768 (d. Poprad, 22 September 1772.)

Three, possibly four, other children later came from this marriage: Charles Maurice Louis Augustus (b.1774?, Madagascar?, d. 11 July 1774, Madagascar); Zsuzsanna Roza (b. 1 January 1779, Beczko, Hungary; d. 26 October 1816, Vieszka, Hungary); Zsofia, (b. 1781, Vieszka, d. 16 February 1817, Bory, Hungary).

=== Prisoner-of-war in Siberia ===
This period of Benyovszky's life has only been documented by Benyovszky himself, in his autobiographical Memoirs. There exists no independent verification of his life in the period between July 1768 and September 1770.

In July 1768, Benyovszky travelled to Poland to join the patriotic forces of the Polish-Lithuanian Commonwealth, who had organised resistance in the Confederation of Bar (Konfederacja Barska), a movement in rebellion against Polish king Stanisław August Poniatowski, lately installed by Russia. In April 1769, he was captured by the Russian forces near Ternopil in Ukraine, imprisoned in the town of Polonne, before being transferred to Kiev in July, and finally to Kazan in September. An escape attempt from Kazan brought him to St Petersburg in November, where he was recaptured and sent to the far east of Siberia as a prisoner. In the company of several other exiles and prisoners – most notably the Swede August Winbladh, and the Russian army-officers Vasilii Panov, Asaf Baturin and Ippolit Stepanov, all of whom played a major role in Benyovszky's life in the next two years – he reached Bolsheretsk, at that time the administrative capital of Kamchatka, in September 1770.

=== Escape from Kamchatka ===
Over the next few months, Benyovszky and Stepanov, along with other exiles and disaffected residents of Kamchatka, organised an escape. From the list of those who participated in the escape (70 men, women, and children), it is evident that the majority were not prisoners or exiles of any sort, but just ordinary working people of Kamchatka. At the start of May, an armed uprising by the group overcame the garrison of Bolsheretsk, during which the commander, Grigorii Nilov, was killed. The supply ship St Peter and St Paul, which had been overwintering in Kamchatka, was seized and loaded with furs and provisions. On 23 May (Old Style: 12 May), the ship set sail from the mouth of the Bolsha River, and headed southwards.

Benyovszky's Memoirs state that the route taken by the ship, having rounded the southernmost point of Kamchatka, was generally north and eastwards, taking in Bering Island, the Bering Strait, Alaska, and the Aleutian Islands. However, in the time available (four weeks according to Benyovszky's own account), this 6000-mile itinerary is barely credible for a leaky ship and inexperienced crew. Such a route is completely absent from three other separate accounts of the voyage (by Ippolit Stepanov, Ivan Ryumin, and Gerasim Izmailov). Additionally, some of the events described by Benyovszky are so implausible that the entire voyage in this area must be considered a fiction.

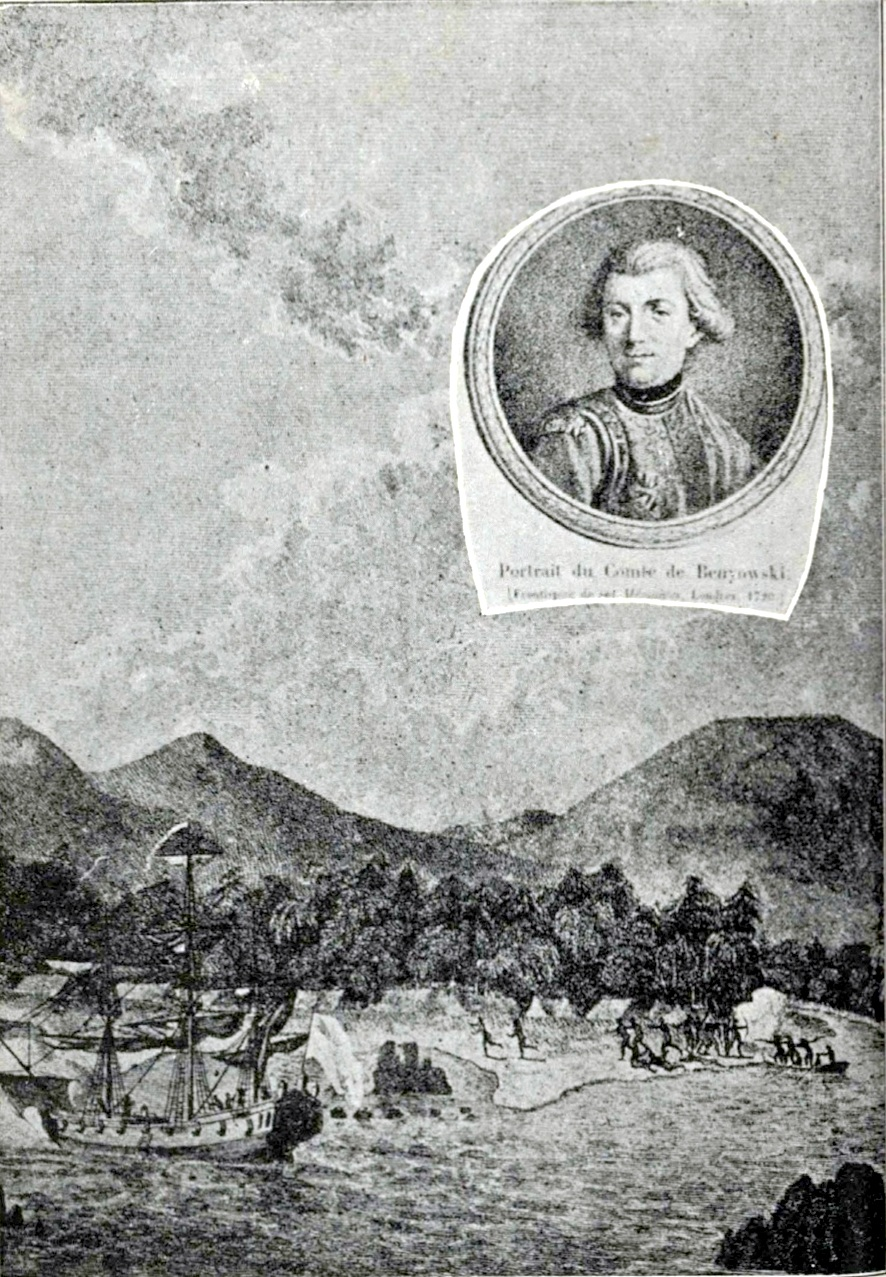
An Affair of Retaliation on Formosa – illustration from the Memoirs

The ship landed at the island of Simushir in the Kuril Islands chain, and stayed there between 29 May and 9 June to bake bread and take stock of their supplies and cargo. During this time, the sailor Izmailov who was judged to be organising a mutiny and two other Kamchatkans were left on the island when the ship finally sailed southwards. Izmailov subsequently carved out a career as an explorer and trader in the Aleutians and the Alaskan coast, providing information to Captain James Cook in the summer of 1778.

Their next known port of call was at Sakinohama on the island of Shikoku in Japan, where they rested between 19 and 23 July, and in the following days at Oshima island in Awa Province. Here the voyagers managed to trade with villagers, despite this being expressly forbidden by the Japanese authorities.

=== Taiwan ===
At the end of July, they landed on Amami-Oshima in the Ryükyü islands, where they also traded successfully. At the end of August they arrived on the island of Formosa (present-day Taiwan), probably at Black Rock Bay, where three of the voyagers were killed during a fight with native islanders.

According to a 1790 English translation of the Memoirs, an eighteen-person party landed on Taiwan's eastern shores in 1771. They met a few people and asked them for food. They were taken to a village and fed rice, pork, lemons, and oranges. They were offered a few knives. While making their way back to the ship, they were hit by arrows. The party fired back and killed six attackers. Near their ship, they were ambushed again by 60 warriors. They defeated their attackers and captured five of them. Benyovszky wanted to leave but his associates insisted on staying. A larger landing party rowed ashore a day later and were met by 50 unarmed locals. The party headed to the village and slaughtered 200 locals while eleven of the party members were injured. They then left and headed north with the guidance of locals.

Upon reaching a "beautiful harbor" they met Don Hieronemo Pacheco, a Spaniard who had been living among the aborigines for seven to eight years. The locals were grateful toward Benyovszky for killing the villagers, who they considered their enemies. Pacheco told Benyovszky that the western side of the island was ruled by the Chinese but the rest was independent or inhabited by aborigines. Pacheco told Benyovszky that it would take very little to conquer the island and drive out the Chinese. On the third day, Benyovszky was calling the harbor "Port Maurice" after himself. Conflict broke out again as the party was fetching fresh water and three members were killed. The party executed their remaining prisoners and slaughtered a boatful of the enemies. By the end, they had killed 1,156 and captured 60 aborigines. They were visited by a prince named Huapo who believed Benyovszky was prophesied to free them from the "Chinese yoke." With Benyovszky's arms, Huapo then defeated his Chinese aligned foes. Huapo gifted Benyovszky's crew with gold and other valuables to try to get them to stay but Benyovszky wanted to go so that he could see his wife and son.

There are reasons to suspect this account of events is either exaggerated or fabricated. Benyovszky's exploits have been questioned by several experts over the years. Ian Inkster's "Orientat Enlightenment: The Problematic Military Claims of Count Maurice Auguste Conte de Benyowsky in Formosa during 1771" criticizes the Taiwan section specifically. The population of Taiwan given by Benyovszky's account is inconsistent with estimates of that time. The stretch of coast he visited likely only had 6,000 to 10,000 inhabitants but somehow the prince was able to gather 25,000 warriors to fight 12,000 enemies. Even in Father de Mailla's account of Taiwan in 1715, in which he portrayed the Chinese in a very negative manner, and spoke of the entire east being in rebellion against the west, the aborigines were still unable to put up a fighting force of more than 30 or 40 armed with arrows and javelins. Huaco was also mentioned to have nearly 100 horsemen while having 68 to spare for the European party's use. Horses were introduced to Taiwan starting in the Dutch period but it is highly unlikely that aborigines of the northeast coast had acquired so many that they could train them for large scale warfare. In other 18th century accounts, it was mentioned that horses were in such scarce supply that Chinese oxen were used as substitutes.

=== Macao ===
They sailed to mainland China, at Dongshan Island. Following the coast down from there, they finally arrived at Macao on 22 September 1771.

Shortly after their arrival in Macao, 15 of the voyagers died, most likely from the effects of malnutrition. Benyovszky took responsibility for selling the ship and all the furs they had loaded at Kamchatka, and then negotiated with the various European trading establishments for passage back to Europe. In late January 1772, two French ships took the survivors away from Macao. Some of them (13) stopped on the island of Mauritius, others died en route (8), and the remainder (26) landed at the French port of Lorient in July.

=== First expedition to Madagascar ===
Benyovszky managed to get a passport to enter the mainland of France and he departed almost immediately for Paris, leaving his companions behind. Over the next months, he toured the ministries and salons of Paris, hoping to persuade someone to fund a trading expedition to one of the several places he claimed to have visited. Eventually, he managed to convince the French Foreign Minister d'Aiguillon and the Navy Secretary de Boynes to fund an expedition of Benyovszky and a large group of 'Benyovszky Volunteers', to set up a French colony on Madagascar.

This expedition arrived in Madagascar in November 1773 and were fully established there by the end of March 1774. They set up a trading-post at Antongil on the east coast and began to negotiate with the islanders for cattle and other supplies. It does not appear to have gone well, since the explorer Kerguelen arrived there shortly afterwards to discover that the Malagasy claimed Benyovszky was at war with them: supplies were therefore hard to come by. A ship which called in at Antongil in July 1774 reported that 180 of the original 237 ordinary 'Volunteers' had died, and 12 of their 22 officers, all taken by sickness. A year later, despite reinforcements, personnel numbers were still dwindling.

Benyovszky's Memoirs state that a son (Charles) was born to him and his wife Anna at some point during 1773 or 1774, and that the son died of fever in July 1774, though this is not verified anywhere else.

Despite these setbacks, over the following two years, Benyovszky sent back to Paris positive reports of his advances in Madagascar, along with requests for more funding, supplies, and personnel. The French authorities and traders on Mauritius, meanwhile, were also writing to Paris, complaining of the problems which Benyovszky was causing for their own trade with Madagascar. In September 1776, Paris sent out two government inspectors to see what Benyovszky had achieved. Their report was damning – little remained of any of the roads, hospitals or trading-posts of which Benyovszky had boasted. Benyovszky's own journal of events upon Madagascar suggests great successes against a recalcitrant people, who eventually proclaimed him to be their supreme chief and King (Ampansacabe); however, this sits at odds with his own reports (and those of the inspectors) of unceasing troubles and minor wars against those same people. In December 1776, just after the government inspectors had departed, Benyovszky left Madagascar. Following the arrival of the inspectors' report in Paris, the few surviving 'Benyovszky Volunteers' were disbanded in May 1778 and the trading post was eventually dismantled by order of the French government in June 1779.

=== Europe and America ===
After leaving Madagascar, Benyovszky arrived back in France in April 1777. He managed to be granted a medal (Order of Saint Louis) and considerable amounts of money in back-pay, and lobbied the ministers for more money and resources for a different development plan for Madagascar. When this plan was turned down, he then petitioned Empress Maria Theresa of Austria for a pardon (for having fled Hungary for Poland in 1768) and made his way to Hungary where he received the title of 'Count' (a title he had been misusing, along with 'Baron', for several years before). In July 1778 he joined the Austrian forces fighting in the War of the Bavarian Succession – in which his brother Emanuel was also fighting – and then in early 1780 he formed a plan to develop the port of Fiume (present-day Rijeka) as a major trading-port for Hungary. He was here until the end of 1781, when he abandoned the project, leaving behind several large debts. He then made his way to the United States and, with a recommendation from Benjamin Franklin, whom he had met in Paris, attempted to persuade George Washington to fund a militia under Benyovszky's leadership, to fight in the American War of Independence. (His brother Ferenc was also at that time in America, fighting as a mercenary against the British). Washington remained unconvinced, and Benyovszky then returned to Europe, arriving in Britain in late 1783. Here he submitted a proposal to the British government for a colony on Madagascar, but was again turned down. Instead he managed to persuade the Royal Society of London luminary Jean Hyacinthe de Magellan to fund an independent expedition; in return, Magellan received full publishing rights over the manuscript of Benyovszky's Memoirs, and the grand title of 'European Plenipotentiary’ for Benyovszky's new trading company. In September 1783, Benyovszky also acquired a document signed by Emperor Joseph II of Austria, which gave Benyovszky Austrian protection for the exploitation and government of Madagascar.

=== Second expedition to Madagascar ===
In April 1784, Benyovszky and several trading partners sailed to America, where a contract was agreed to with two Baltimore traders, Zollichofer and Meissonier. The deal was for monetary investment in return for a regular supply of slaves. In October of that year, the ship Intrepid sailed for Madagascar, arriving near Cap St Sebastien in north-west of the island, June 1785. Here the expedition was met with aggression from the Sakalava people; Benyovszky and a number of others were captured and disappeared, presumed dead. The surviving members of the company sailed for Mozambique, sold the ship and dispersed.

In January 1786, however, Benyovszky was reported to be alive and operating at Angonsty (near modern-day Ambohitralanana). Anxious about another disruption to trade, François de Souillac, the French governor of Mauritius waited for fair winds and then sent a small military force over to Madagascar to deal with Benyovszky. On 23 or 24 May 1786, Benyovszky was ambushed and killed by these troops, and was buried on the site of his encampment. (Most biographies cite 23 May based on the statement by Benyovszky's 1790 editor William Nicholson, but French sources documented by Prosper Cultru cite 24 May.)

The Warsaw newspaper Gazeta Warszawska, in its edition of 1 December 1787, reported that the famous Hungarian Baron Beniowski, who was said so many times to have died, was at that time in Vienna, where he had come from Istanbul. There is no further report of Benyovszky being alive after 1786, so this report was probably a false rumour or misunderstanding.

== Legacy ==
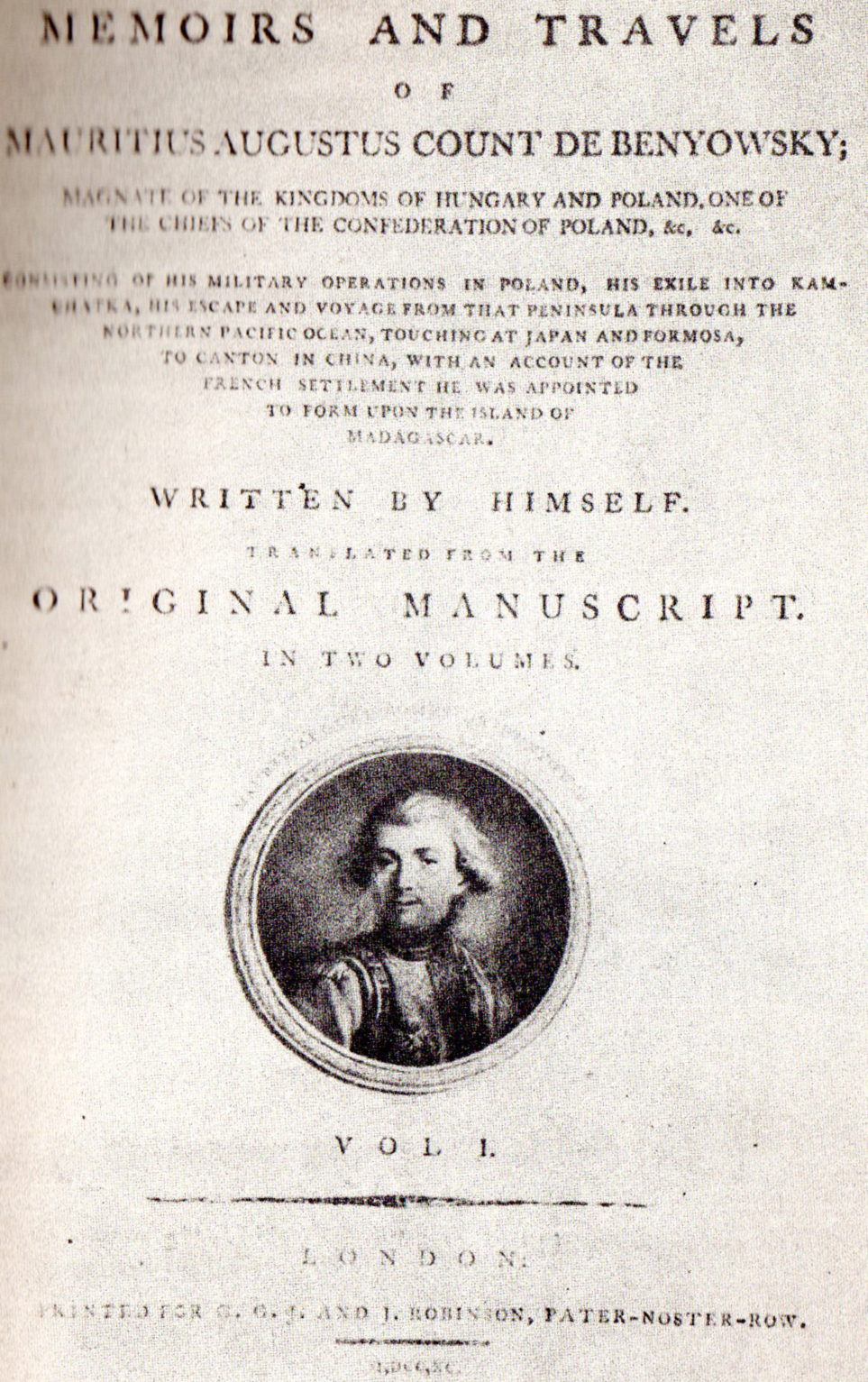
Frontispiece of the London 1790 edition of Benyovszky's Memoirs

Much of what Benyovszky claimed to have done in Poland, Kamchatka, Japan, Formosa, and Madagascar is questionable at best, but in any case has left no lasting traces in the history of war, exploration, or colonialism. His legacy resides largely in his autobiography (Memoirs and Travels of Mauritius Augustus Count de Benyowsky), which was published in two volumes in 1790 by friends of Magellan, who was by then, as a result of the failed Malagasy venture, in serious financial difficulties. Even at the time of the first publication of the book, it was met with significant scepticism by reviewers. Despite this criticism, it was a great publishing success, and has since been translated into several languages; (German 1790, 1791, 1796, 1797; Dutch 1791; French 1791; Swedish 1791; Polish 1797; Slovak 1808; and Hungarian 1888).

The Kamchatkan portion of Memoirs was adapted into a number of successful plays and operas (plays by Kotzebue 1792 and Vulpius 1794 and Operas by Boieldieu 1800 and Doppler 1847) which were performed in suitable translation all over Europe and America. The Polish national bard Juliusz Słowacki published a poem about him in 1841. Since 1970, films and television series have been made – a Czechoslovak-Hungarian television series in 1975 (Vivát Benyovszky!, director: Igor Ciel), "Die unfreiwilligen Reisen des Moritz August Benjowski“ (a television series in four episodes, director: Helmut Pigge, aired by the West German ZDF in 1975), a documentary for Hungarian TV in 2009 (Benyovszky Móric és a malgasok földje, director: Zsolt Cseke), and a Hungarian film Benyovszky, the Rebel Countof 2012 (director Irina Stanciulescu).

In Hungary, Slovakia and Poland he is still celebrated as a significant national hero. A Hungarian-Malagasy Friendship organisation promotes the links between Benyovszky and Madagascar, arranges conferences and other meetings, and maintains a website dedicated to the celebration of Benyovszky's life. The Polish writer Arkady Fiedler visited Madagascar in 1937, spent several months in the town of Ambinanitelo and later wrote a popular travel book describing his experiences. In it, he gives a romanticised version of Benyovszky's career. The Hungarian writer Miklós Rónaszegi also wrote a book about him in 1955, titled The Great Game (A Nagy Játszma).

Fiedler appears to have made an effort to find out if Benyovszky was still remembered by the island's people – with mixed results. In fact his name did survive in Madagascar – in recent years, a street in the island capital Antananarivo was renamed 'Lalana Benyowski'.

The Hungarian writer Mór Jókai played an important role in popularizing Benyovszky in Hungary through his four-volume work, published between 1888 and 1891. The first two volumes consist of a literary biography of Benyovszky, while the final two contain Jókai's Hungarian translation of Benyovszky's memoirs, based on the English edition.

=== Slovakization ===
Benyovszky entered Slovak popular culture in 1933 through Jožo Nižnánsky's highly successful fictionalized novel, which portrayed him as a Slovak hero who brought fame to Slovakia. This interpretation was further reinforced by the historical television series Vivat Beňovský (1973–1975), a Hungarian–Slovak co-production. Thanks to the series, Benyovszky entered the cultural memory of both Hungarians and Slovaks as the "King of Madagascar". The Hungarian and Slovak scriptwriters based their work on Mór Jókai's four-volume publication as well as on Benyovszky's memoirs, although the script also shows a strong influence of Nižnánsky's fictionalized narrative. Unlike in his own memoirs, where he described himself as Hungarian and Polish, in the Slovak version of the television series, Benyovszky declares himself to be Slovak. However, the Hungarian producers took into account that Benyovszky was regarded as an important figure in Hungarian history, accordingly, in the Hungarian version of the same scene, he declares himself to be Hungarian.

In Slovak historical discourse and in the popular-history publications on Slovak history, figures such as Móric Benyovszky are often presented simply as Slovak.

According to the Hungarian-language press in both Hungary and Slovakia, Slovak organizations have in recent years organized expeditions to Madagascar to promote Benyovszky exclusively as a Slovak historical figure. These sources have also reported the removal or destruction of several monuments and memorials associated with Benyovszky's Hungarian heritage. Two memorials erected by Hungarians were destroyed by unknown perpetrators: one on the hill where Benyovszky's Fort Mauritania was located, and another in Maroantsetra, where the pedestal of a monument erected by Hungarians was demolished. In the center of Antalaha, Slovak organizations erected memorials commemorating Benyovszky as a Slovak figure. Hungarian-language sources have characterized these activities as an attempt to Slovakize his historical legacy.

== See also ==
- Kingdom of Hungary
- History of Madagascar
- Age of Exploration
- Habsburg monarchy
- Reign of Maria Theresa
