= Manakambahiny Ankavia =

- Location in Madagascar
- Coordinates: 15°14′S 50°04′E
- Country: Madagascar
- Region: Sava
- District: Antalaha

Population (2019)Census
  - Total: 7,830
- Time zone: UTC3 (EAT)
- Postal code: 206

Manakambahiny Ankavia is a rural municipality in northern Madagascar. It belongs to the district of Antalaha, which is a part of Sava Region. The municipality has a populations of 7,830 inhabitants (2019).

== Agriculture ==
The agriculture is mainly substantial: rice, manioc, banana, sugar cane, next to vanilla, cloves and coffee are planted.

== Tourism ==
It is situated at the border of the Masoala National Park on the river Ankavia.
