= Marofinaritra =

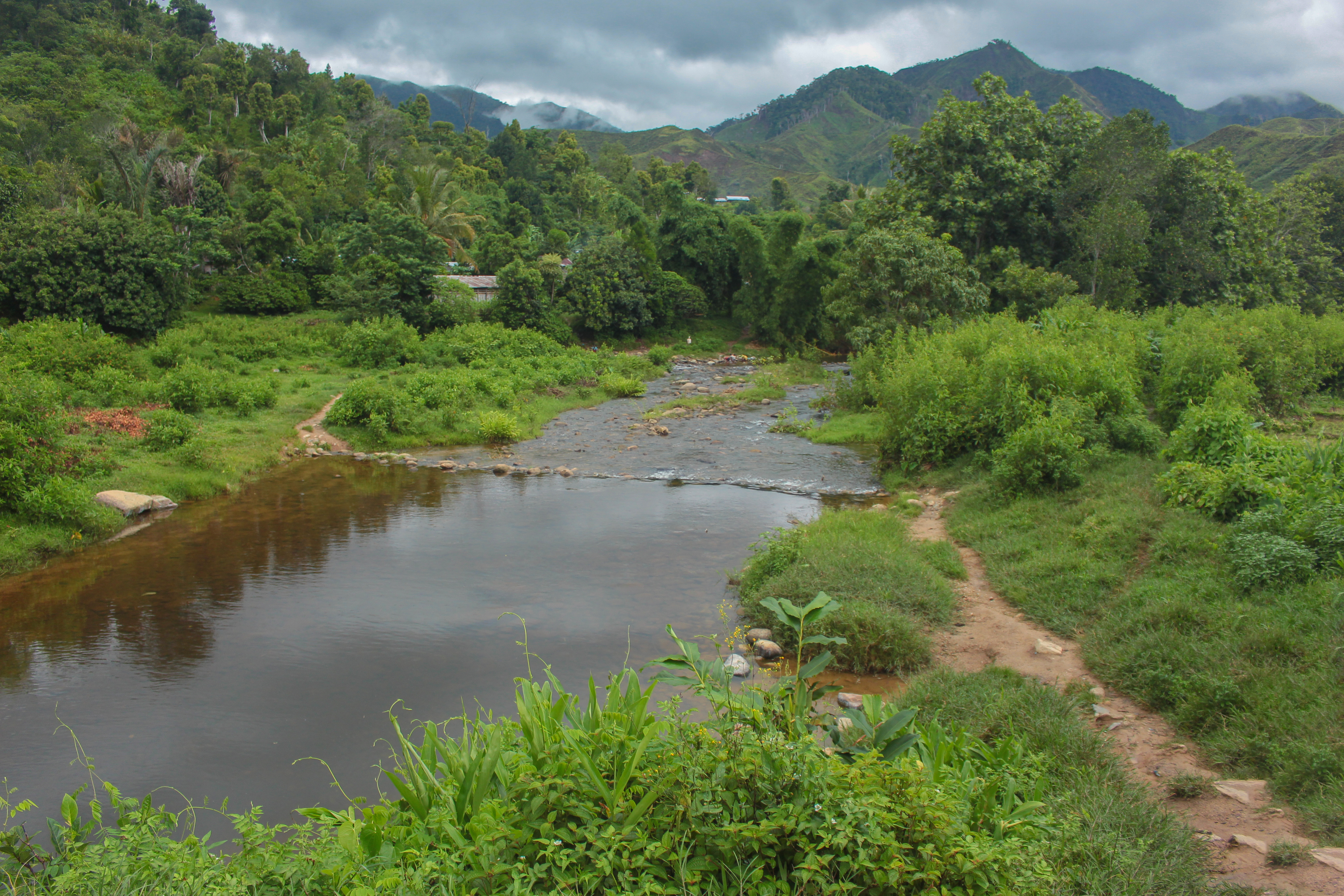
- in Ampokafo, fokontany of Marofinaritra

- Location in Madagascar
- Coordinates: 15°2′S 50°7′E
- Country: Madagascar
- Region: Sava
- District: Antalaha

Population (2001)
  - Total: 14,546
- Time zone: UTC3 (EAT)

Marofinaritra is a rural municipality and village in northeast Madagascar. It belongs to the district of Antalaha, which is a part of Sava Region.

== Demography ==
According to 2001 census the population of the commune of Marofinaritra was 14,546. 16 villages are located within the boundaries of the commune. The area of the commune is very big and includes a lot of very sparsely populated forest areas. Based on projected population data for 2010 the population density was 8 inhabitants per square kilometer. The village Marofinaritra proper had 1,700 inhabitants in 2007.

== Geography and Transportation ==
The village of Marofinaritra is located at the western banks of the Ankavia River, 35 kilometers southwest of the town and district headquarter Antalaha. The national highway 5a ends in Marofinarita which means that the village is the westernmost place accessible by car, coming from Antalaha.

== Economy and Education ==
There are several shops, small restaurants and a hotel at the main street. The town is used as a base by tourists who want cross the national highway Masoala Peninsula.

Primary and junior level secondary education are available in town. The majority 98% of the population are farmers. The most important crop is vanilla, while other important products are coffee and rice. Industry and services provide both employment for 1% of the population.
