= Irena Blühová =

Slovak photographer (1904–1991)

- Born: self-portrait 1931–1932; 2 March 1904; Vágbeszterce, Kingdom of Hungary, Austria-Hungary
- Died: 30 November 1991 (aged 87); Bratislava, Czechoslovakia
- Occupations: photographer, academic
- Years active: 1924–1989

Irena Blühová (2 March 1904 – 30 November 1991) was one of the first women Slovak photographers and one of the first photographers in Czechoslovakia to use photography as a means of documentary study and social commentary. During World War II she was a communist dissident, working in the underground to disseminate literature and help refugees fleeing persecution. After the war, she helped establish the State Pedagogical Institute and founded the Slovak Pedagogic Library. Late in life she returned to the pursuit of photography and participated in many international exhibitions.

== Early life ==
Irena Blühová was born on 2 March 1904 in Vágbeszterce (now Považská Bystrica) a village in the Kingdom of Hungary, which at the time was part of the Austro-Hungarian Empire. Her father, Móricnak Blüh was a trader, and her mother's family, Balázs, came from the northern district in Árva County and were poets and intellectuals. She attended school in Trencsén, traveling there daily and supplemented her education by reading classic literature including Goethe, Heine and Schiller, from her grandfather's library. She had five sisters and a brother, and was a tomboy, preferring the sporting activities and freedom men experienced. From 1914 to 1918, she attended the Girl's Gymnasium in Trencsén and was influenced by the images of wounded soldiers of World War I and the Russian Revolution, prisoners and the weary populace at the beginning of the Czechoslovak Republic. When the war ended, the family needed the children to work and she took a job in a law office in Považská Bystrica, working as a typist. Later, she worked as a clerk in a bank and in 1921, joined the Czechoslovak Communist Party (Slovak: Komunistická strana Československa (KSČ)).

== Career ==
In 1924, Blühová acquired her first camera, a Görz-Tenax, becoming one of the first Slovak women photographers from her future husband, the artist, Imro Weiner-Kráľ. By 1925, she began taking pictures of the social and cultural surroundings of Horná Mariková and then returning home took pictures around Árva and Kysuce. The earliest works are beautiful vistas and promotional images used for tourist publications. Gradually her subjects changed and were typically of workers, not posed, but going about their daily lives. Having not yet received any photographic training, she used angles to emphasize elements of her work, which marked a photographic trend at the time of combining realistic imagery and political agenda, rejecting bourgeois glossy posed images, which had no social value. This type of social photography began in Germany in the 1920s and spread to Russia and then to Czechoslovakia. Changing to a Rolleiflex camera, she took photographs of abject poverty, beggars, child laborers, but also workers doing their jobs as basket makers and shepherds, as a means of social commentary and was published in newspapers and magazines like the Slovensky Svet (Slovak World) and Krásy Slovenska (The Beauty of Slovakia), and later in the Arbeiter-Illustrierte-Zeitung and Der Arbeiter-Fotograf (Workers Photography).

In early 1931, Blühová began studying at the Bauhaus in Dessau under the photographer Walter Peterhans. Her formal training there did not last beyond 1932, when the Nazi regime closed the art school, but her work from this point further was influenced by the experimentation and more complex composition, which she learned at Bauhaus. Called back to Czechoslovakia by the KSČ, she settled in Bratislava and in early 1933 opened a bookstore on Mariánska street called Blüh kníhkupectvo (Blüh Bookshop). The shop carried art books, fiction, philosophy, and left-oriented political literature, soon becoming a gathering place for artists, journalists and students. Along with Zsigmondi Borbálát, Rosa Neyt, Fric Stroht and others, Blühová founded the group Sociofoto to develop sociologically oriented and social documentary photography. Rather than putting their own names on their works, the photographers used only the word "Sociofoto" to show its collective anonymity.

Blühová earned the nickname the "Bratislavan Gertrude Stein" and staged several small exhibitions to raise funds for the activities of the International Anti-Fascist Solidarity Federation. She participated in the international photographic exhibition of Prague in 1933 and in 1934 exhibited in Sociofoto's show in Bratislava, which was the first attempt of portraying social photography in the country. As the war neared, Blühová's photographic work slowed, while her activities for the party increased. She published and disseminated communist materials in a back room of the bookstore to hide from censors and assisted refugees who fled from Austria, Germany, and Hungary with food, clothing and shelter, before passing them on to other activists.

From 1937 to 1939, Blühová took pottery classes with Julia Horová and studied film at the School of Applied Arts (Slovak: Škola umeleckých remesiel (ŠUR)) with Karel Plicka. The school was modeled after the Bauhaus and was closed for similar reasons in 1939. In 1941, her dissident activities were discovered and Blühová was only able to escape arrest because friends learned of her warrant and warned her. Escaping to the mountains of Malá Fatra she lived in a remote cottage and later found work using false papers under the name of Elena Fischerová in Humenné at a fuel factory. Her husband, Weiner-Král´ spent the war years in France working for the resistance. Blühová remained active in underground activities until the end of World War II.

During the 1940s, Blühová produced photographs for the works of writers like Krista Bendová and Ján Kostra. She held several positions in publishing houses, such as helping to found Pravda Publishing in 1945 and running it until 1948 when her daughter Zsuzsanna was born. In 1951 Blühová began teaching at the State Pedagogical Institute and then in 1955 founded the Slovak Pedagogic Library, serving as its director until 1965. She also taught at the Teacher Training College until the late 1960s and in 1964, Blühová received the Medal of Work in recognition of her help to develop the state. However, her support for liberalization during the Prague Spring in 1968, led to her being branded as undesirable and a short censorship being placed on distribution of her works. In the 1970s and 1980s, she did solo exhibitions in Bratislava (1974), Berlin (1977), Helsinki (1981), Leipzig (1983), Trencin (1984), Banská Bystrica (1986), Bonn (1987), and Prague (1989). In 1989, Blühová received the Josef Sudek Medal commemorating her photography work at the celebration for 150 Years of Photography. After her retirement she taught in institutions for physically and mentally handicapped children for three years. Blühová died on 30 November 1991 in Bratislava, Slovak Republic.
