= Antsambalahy =

- Location in Madagascar
- Coordinates: 14°43′S 49°55′E
- Country: Madagascar
- Region: Sava
- District: Antalaha
- Elevation: 236 m (774 ft)

Population (2001)
  - Total: 11,284
- Time zone: UTC3 (EAT)

Antsambalahy is a commune (Malagasy: kaominina) in northern Madagascar. It belongs to the district of Antalaha, which is a part of Sava Region. According to 2001 census the population of Antsambalahy was 11,284.

Only primary schooling is available in town. The majority 99.9% of the population are farmers. The most important crop is vanilla, while other important products are coffee and rice. Services provide employment for 0.1% of the population.
