= Antananambo =

- Location in Madagascar
- Coordinates: 15°10′S 50°22′E
- Country: Madagascar
- Region: Sava
- District: Antalaha

Population (2001)
  - Total: 18,232
- Time zone: UTC3 (EAT)

Antananambo or Antanambao is a commune (Malagasy: kaominina) in northern Madagascar. It belongs to the district of Antalaha, which is a part of Sava Region. According to 2001 census the population of Antananambo was 18,232.

Only primary schooling is available in town. The majority 99% of the population are farmers. The most important crops are rice and vanilla, while other important agricultural products are sugarcane, cloves and cassava. Services provide employment for 1% of the population.
