= Ambinanifaho =

- Location in Madagascar
- Coordinates: 14°37′S 50°8′E
- Country: Madagascar
- Region: Sava
- District: Antalaha

Population (2001)
  - Total: 6,573
- Time zone: UTC3 (EAT)
- Postal code: 206

Ambinanifaho is a municipality in northern Madagascar. It belongs to the district of Antalaha, which is a part of Sava Region. According to 2001 census the population of Ambinanifaho was 6,573.

Primary and junior level secondary education are available in town. The majority 99% of the population are farmers. The most important crop is vanilla, while other important products are coffee, cloves and rice. Services provide employment for 1% of the population.
