= Antsahanoro =

- Location in Madagascar
- Coordinates: 14°50′S 50°8′E
- Country: Madagascar
- Region: Sava
- District: Antalaha

Population (2001)
  - Total: 16,253
- Time zone: UTC3 (EAT)

Antsahanoro is a commune (Malagasy: kaominina) in northern Madagascar. It belongs to the district of Antalaha, which is a part of Sava Region. According to 2001 census the population of Antsahanoro was 16,253.

Primary and junior level secondary education are available in town. The majority 98% of the population are farmers. The most important crops are rice and vanilla, while other important agricultural products are coffee and cloves. Services provide employment for 2% of the population.
