= Sarahandrano =

Commune in Madagascar

- Location in Madagascar
- Coordinates: 14°47′S 50°1′E
- Country: Madagascar
- Region: Sava
- District: Antalaha

Population (2001)
  - Total: 12,758
- Time zone: UTC3 (EAT)

Sarahandrano is a commune (Malagasy: kaominina) in northern Madagascar. It belongs to the district of Antalaha, which is a part of Sava Region. According to 2001 census the population of Sarahandrano was 12,758.

Primary and junior level secondary education are available in town. 99% of the population is engaged in agriculture. The most important crops in the area are rice, vanilla, and coffee. The service industry provides employment for the remaining 1% of the population.
