= Ampanavoana =

- Location in Madagascar
- Coordinates: 15°40′S 50°12′E
- Country: Madagascar
- Region: Sava
- District: Antalaha
- Elevation: 18 m (59 ft)

Population (2019)Census
  - Total: 13,009
- Time zone: UTC3 (EAT)
- Postal code: 206

Ampanavoana is a rural municipality in northern Madagascar. It belongs to the district of Antalaha, which is a part of Sava Region. The municipality has a populations of 13,009 inhabitants (2019).

== Population ==
The population is young. 51,37% have 15 years or less, 45.79% between 15 and 60 years and 2,84% of an age of more than 60 years.

== Rivers ==
Four rivers cross the municipality: Anjanazana river, Ampanavoana river, Ampanio and Fampotakely.

== Agriculture ==
The agriculture is mainly subsistential: rice, manioc, banana, sugar cane and coco nuts. Next to it also vanilla, cloves and coffee is planted.

== Tourism ==
It is situated at the border of the Masoala National Park.
