= Andampy =

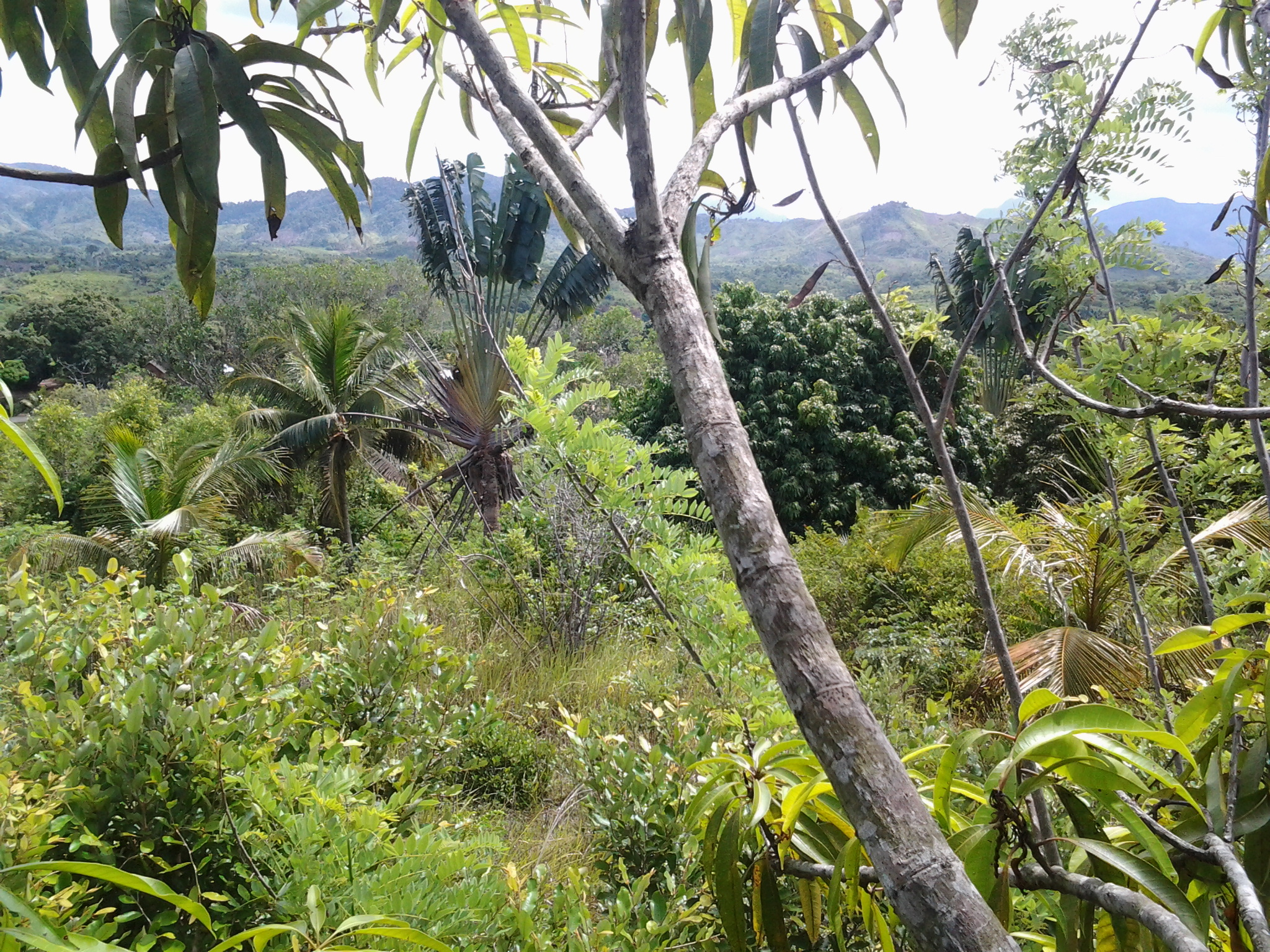
- Forest at Andampy

- Location in Madagascar
- Coordinates: 14°54′S 49°52′E
- Country: Madagascar
- Region: Sava
- District: Antalaha
- Elevation: 18 m (59 ft)

Population (2019)Census
  - Total: 6,843
- Time zone: UTC3 (EAT)
- Postal code: 206

Andampy is a rural municipality in northern Madagascar. It belongs to the district of Antalaha, which is a part of Sava Region. The municipality has a populations of 6,843 inhabitants (2019).

== Agriculture ==
The agriculture is mainly subsistential: rice, manioc, banana, sugar cane and coco nuts. Next to it also vanilla, cloves and coffee is planted.

== Tourism ==
It is situated at the border of the Masoala National Park.
