= Ampohibe =

- Location in Madagascar
- Coordinates: 15°2′S 50°18′E
- Country: Madagascar
- Region: Sava
- District: Antalaha

Population (2019)Census
  - Total: 14,433
- Time zone: UTC3 (EAT)
- Postal code: 206

Ampohibe is a commune (Malagasy: kaominina) in northern Madagascar. It belongs to the district of Antalaha, which is a part of Sava Region. The municipality has a populations of 14,433 inhabitants (2019).

Only primary schooling is available in town. The majority 99.9% of the population are farmers. The most important crop is vanilla, while other important products are coffee and rice. Services provide employment for 0.1% of the population.
