= Jean Hyacinthe de Magellan =

Jean Hyacinthe de Magellan (Portuguese: João Jacinto de Magalhães) (1722–1790) was a Portuguese natural philosopher.

== Life ==
He was born in Aveiro, Portugal, on 4 November 1722. He seems to have been brought up at Lisbon, where he became a monk of the order of St. Augustine, and was pursuing his studies in the Portuguese capital when the city was destroyed by the earthquake of 1755.

At age 40 Magellan abandoned the monastic life. About 1764 he appears to have reached England and was in communication with Da Costa of the Royal Society in 1766. For some time he acted as tutor on continental tours, and made the acquaintance of leading scholars of the day, especially in the Netherlands. Magellan was elected a fellow of the Royal Society in 1774, and was a corresponding member of the academies of science in Paris, Madrid, and St. Petersburg.

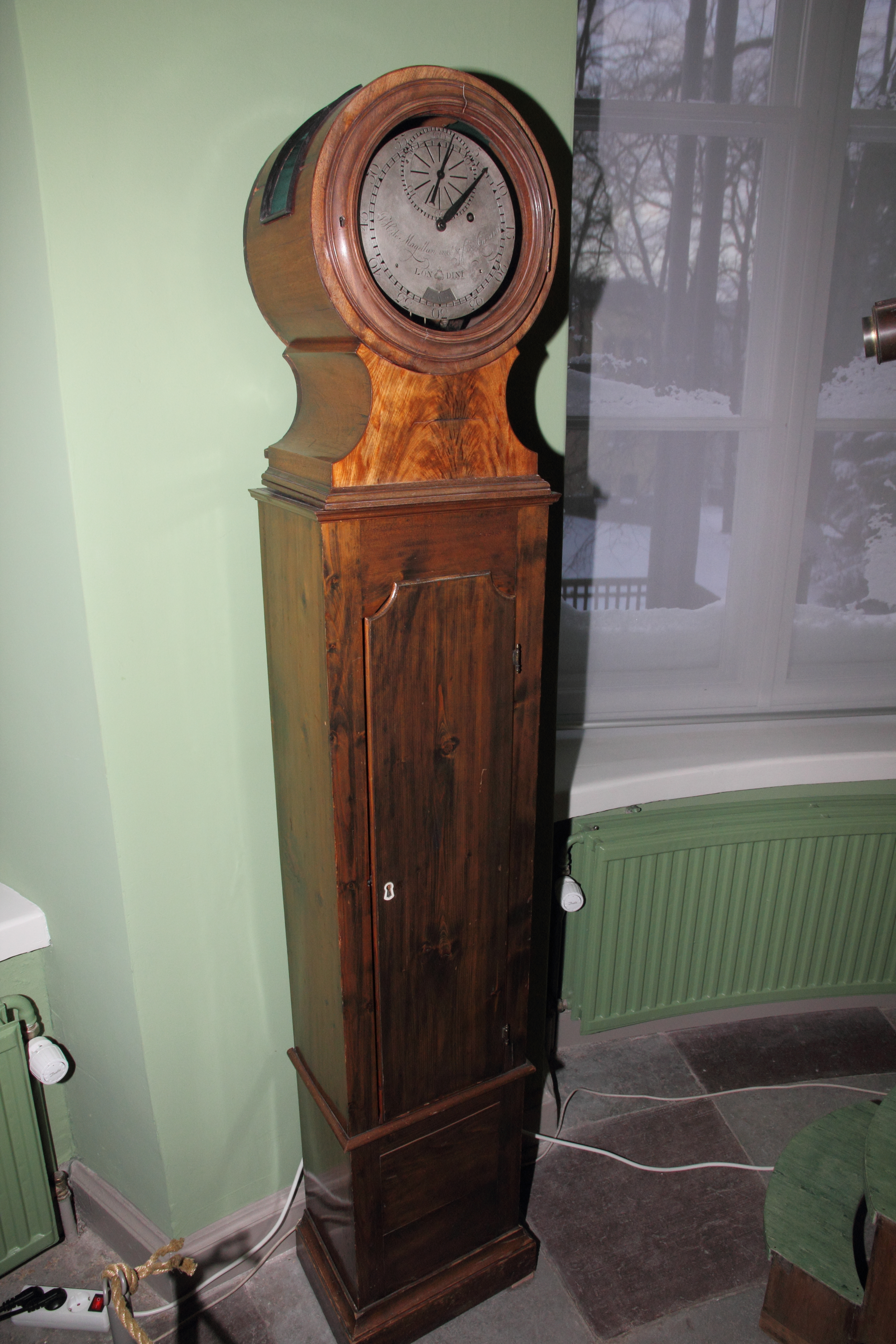
Astronomical clock made by Jean Hyacinthe de Magellan, now in Helsinki

In June 1778 Magellan was at Ermenonville, the seat of the Marquis de Gerardin, and there, with M. du Presle, he visited Jean-Jacques Rousseau a few days before his death on 2 July. He added a postscript describing his visit to Du Presle's Relation des derniers Jours de J. J. Rousseau, London, 1778. Magellan settled in London soon afterwards. He was for some time engaged in superintending the construction of a set of astronomical and meteorological instruments for the court of Madrid, which he described in 1779. He devoted his last years to the construction of instruments including thermometers and barometers. He made a clock for the blind Louis Engelbert, 6th Duke of Arenberg, which indicated by bells the hours and other readings.

Among Magellan's friends was the Hungarian count Maurice Benyovszky. About 1784 the count borrowed a large sum from Magellan, and was soon afterwards shot as a pirate by the French in Madagascar. Magellan never recovered the money. He died on 7 February 1790, after more than a year's illness and was buried in Islington churchyard. Although there are claims that, due to his laxity and unorthodoxy, he renounced his faith, his correspondence and other sources confirm he never gave up Catholicism.

== Works ==
Magellan's major works were:

- Collection de différens Traités sur des Instrumens d'Astronomie, 1775–80.
- Description des Octants et Sextants Anglois, dedicated to Turgot, 1775.
- Description of a Glass Apparatus for Making Mineral Waters, 1777; 3rd edit. 1783.
- Description et Usages des nouveaux Baromètres pour mesurer la Hauteur des Montagnes et la Profondeur des Mines, 1779.
- Essai sur la nouvelle Théorie du Feu élémentaire, et de la Chaleur des Corps, 1780.
- An Essay towards a System of Mineralogy, 1788.
- Mémoires de Maurice Auguste, Comte de Benyowsky.

Magellan also wrote articles in the Journal de Physique, 1778–83. On the title-page of his translation of Axel Fredrik Cronstedt's System of Mineralogy, 1788, he assumed the appellation "Talabrico-Lusitanus".

Magellan gave Count Benyovszky's memoirs to William Nicholson, who published them in English in 1790. Magellan's French version of the memoirs appeared after his death, and letters of Magellan to Benyowsky were published in Mór Jókai's edition of the count's memoirs.

In 1784, Magellan was elected a member of the American Philosophical Society in Philadelphia. The Magellanic Premium, a prize given for advances in navigation, was established at the American Philosophical Society in 1786 by a grant given by him.

== Notes ==
Attribution

This article incorporates text from a publication now in the public domain: Lee, Sidney, ed. (1893). "Magellan, Jean Hyacinthe de". Dictionary of National Biography. Vol. 35. London: Smith, Elder & Co.
