= Antombana =

- Location in Madagascar
- Coordinates: 15°0′S 50°10′E
- Country: Madagascar
- Region: Sava
- District: Antalaha

Population (2001)
  - Total: 18,592
- Time zone: UTC3 (EAT)

Antombana is a commune (Malagasy: kaominina) in northern Madagascar. It belongs to the district of Antalaha, which is a part of Sava Region. According to 2001 census the population of Antombana was 18,592.

Only primary schooling is available in town. The majority 99% of the population are farmers. The most important crop is vanilla, while other important products are banana, coffee, cloves and rice. Services provide employment for 1% of the population.
