= Ampahana =

- Location in Madagascar
- Coordinates: 14°45′S 50°13′E
- Country: Madagascar
- Region: Sava
- District: Antalaha

Population (2001)
  - Total: 25,000
- Time zone: UTC3 (EAT)

Ampahana is a town and commune (Malagasy: kaominina) in northern Madagascar. It belongs to the district of Antalaha, which is a part of Sava Region. According to 2001 commune census the population of Ampahana was 25,000.

Only primary schooling is available in town. The majority 85% of the population are farmers, while an additional 2% receives their livelihood from raising livestock. The most important crop is vanilla, while other important products are pineapple, coffee and rice. Industry and services provide employment for 3% and 5% of the population, respectively. Additionally fishing employs 5% of the population.
