= Krista Bendová =

- Born: Kristína Bendová; 27 January 1923 Kráľova Lehota, Czechoslovakia
- Died: 27 January 1988 (aged 65) Bratislava, Czechoslovakia
- Occupation: writer

Krista Bendová (27 January 1923 – 27 January 1988) was a Slovak writer, poet and journalist. She is best known for her works for children and young adults.

== Early life and education ==
She was born on 27 January 1923, in Kráľova Lehota, as Kristína Bendová; she received her first name after her mother. Her father, Oldřich Benda, was a railway clerk. She attended schools in Kremnica, Nové Zámky and Banská Bystrica, where she passed her final exams in 1942. In the years 1942–1945, she studied Slovak and Russian philology at the Slovak University in Bratislava, and briefly attended classes at the Theater Academy.

== Career ==
Bendová published her first poems while studying. In 1948, she published her debut tome of poetry Listy milému. She worked first at the Pravda publishing house, then at the secretariat of the Czechoslovak Writers' Union. Before dedicating herself entirely to writing books, for years she was the editor of the magazines Ohník and Roháč, and later of the newspaper Pravda. She wrote 54 books, screenplays for TV films and also translated literature from Czech and Russian. In 1962, she received the Czechoslovak Peace Prize and in 1970, the Fraňo Kráľ Award.

She was married to the writer Ján Kostra, with whom she wrote several children's books. The couple had three sons (Ján, Juraj and Michal), who appear in the book Opice z našej police.

There is a street in Bratislava named after her.

== Works ==
=== Poetry ===
- 1948 – Listy milému
- 1948 – Milenec smútok
- 1948 – Ruky
- 1950 – Krajina šťastia
- 1955 – O tú pieseň
- 1960 – Cez oheň a vody, wybór
- 1965 – Riziko
- 1967 – Variácie na Osudovú a Nedokončenú
- 1976 – Pred zrkadlom, wybór

=== Poetry for children and young adults ===
- 1949 – Čačky-hračky
- 1950 – Čo sa robí, čo sa stalo
- 1951 – Vtáčky (under the pseudonym Kristián Benko)
- 1951 – Zvieratá (with Ján Kostra)
- 1952 – Pioniersky pochod
- 1953 – Priamy smer do Tatier (with Ján Kostra)
- 1954 – Lesné zvieratká
- 1955 – Ako Jožko Pletko poplietol si všetko
- 1956 – Bola raz jedna trieda
- 1957 – Cirkus Hopsasa
- 1959 – Ako Jožko Pletko upratať chcel všetko
- 1962 – Čiernobiela rozprávka
- 1962 – Odvezte sa, odvezte, po vode i po ceste
- 1962 – Frčko a ježko
- 1963 – Kvapôčky
- 1963 – Sedem zlatých tajomstiev
- 1963 – Maťko ide do školy
- 1969 – Bimbo cestuje
- 1969 – Rozpovie ti táto knižka, koho zjedla Miki-myška
- 1969 – Mám koníčka bieleho, picture book
- 1969 – Zakvákala žabka, picture book
- 1970 – Zázračné cvičky
- 1971 – Rozprávky z počítadla
- 1978 – Odtrhni si básničku, picture book
- 1986 – Básničky maličkým
- 1986 – V tejto knižke rapoce straka…

=== Prose for children and young adults ===
- 1955 – Nezábudky
- 1966 – Kde bolo, tam nebolo
- 1967 – Opice z našej police
- 1967 – Osmijanko rozpráva osem rozprávok o zvieratkách
- 1967 – Osmijanko rozpráva osem rozprávok o zázračných krajinách
- 1967 – Osmijanko rozpráva osem rozprávok o princeznách
- 1968 – Osmijanko rozpráva osem rozprávok o vtáčikoch
- 1968 – Osmijanko rozpráva osem rozprávok o detektívoch
- 1969 – Osmijanko rozpráva osem podvodných rozprávok
- 1969 – Osmijanko rozpráva osem lesných rozprávok
- 1969 – Osmijanko rozpráva osem sladkých rozprávok
- 1974 – Dobrodružstvá Samka Klamka
- 1981 – Rozprávky z Dúbravky
- 1988 – Šťastný pes
- 1994 – Brumlíčkove rozprávky
- 1999 – O prváckom mačiatku

=== Other works for children and young adults ===
- 1950 – Umelci deťom
- 1959 – Prvé kroky (with Irena Blühová)
- 1959 – Grécko žaluje (reportage)
- 1959 – Líška – staviteľka
- 1971 – Tryskom na ihrisko
- 1976 – Čudná torta
