= Ambalabe, Antalaha =

Ambalabe
- Location in Madagascar
- Coordinates: 15°10′S 50°25′E
- Country: Madagascar
- Region: Sava
- District: Antalaha

Population (2001)
  - Total: 16,250
- Time zone: UTC3 (EAT)

Ambalabe is a town and commune (Malagasy: kaominina) in northern Madagascar. It belongs to the district of Antalaha, which is a part of Sava Region. According to 2001 commune census the population of Ambalabe was 16,250.

Ambalabe has a riverine harbour. The majority 80% of the population are farmers, while an additional 13% receives their livelihood from raising livestock. The most important crop is vanilla, while other important products are sugarcane and rice. Services provide employment for 2% of the population. Additionally fishing employs 5% of the population.

Ambalabe is known for its lush vegetation and tropical climate, typical of the region. The town is surrounded by dense forests, rivers, and waterfalls.

In addition to its agricultural significance, Antalaha offers opportunities for outdoor activities and exploration. The nearby rainforests and national parks provide habitat for a range of flora and fauna, including various species of lemurs, chameleons, and bird species. Visitors to the region engage in hiking, birdwatching and nature tours.
