= Antalaha District =

- District
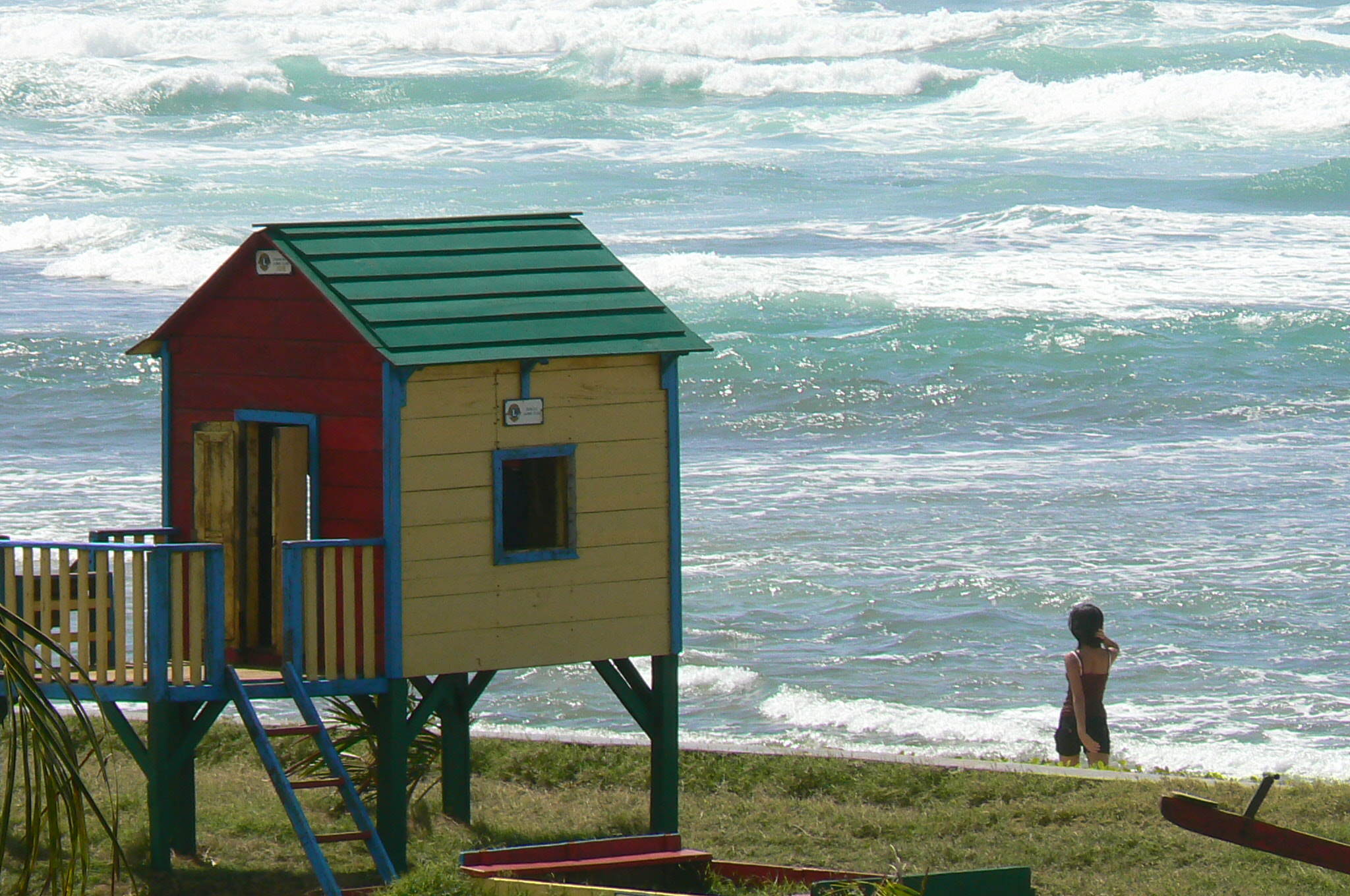
- the beach in Antalaha

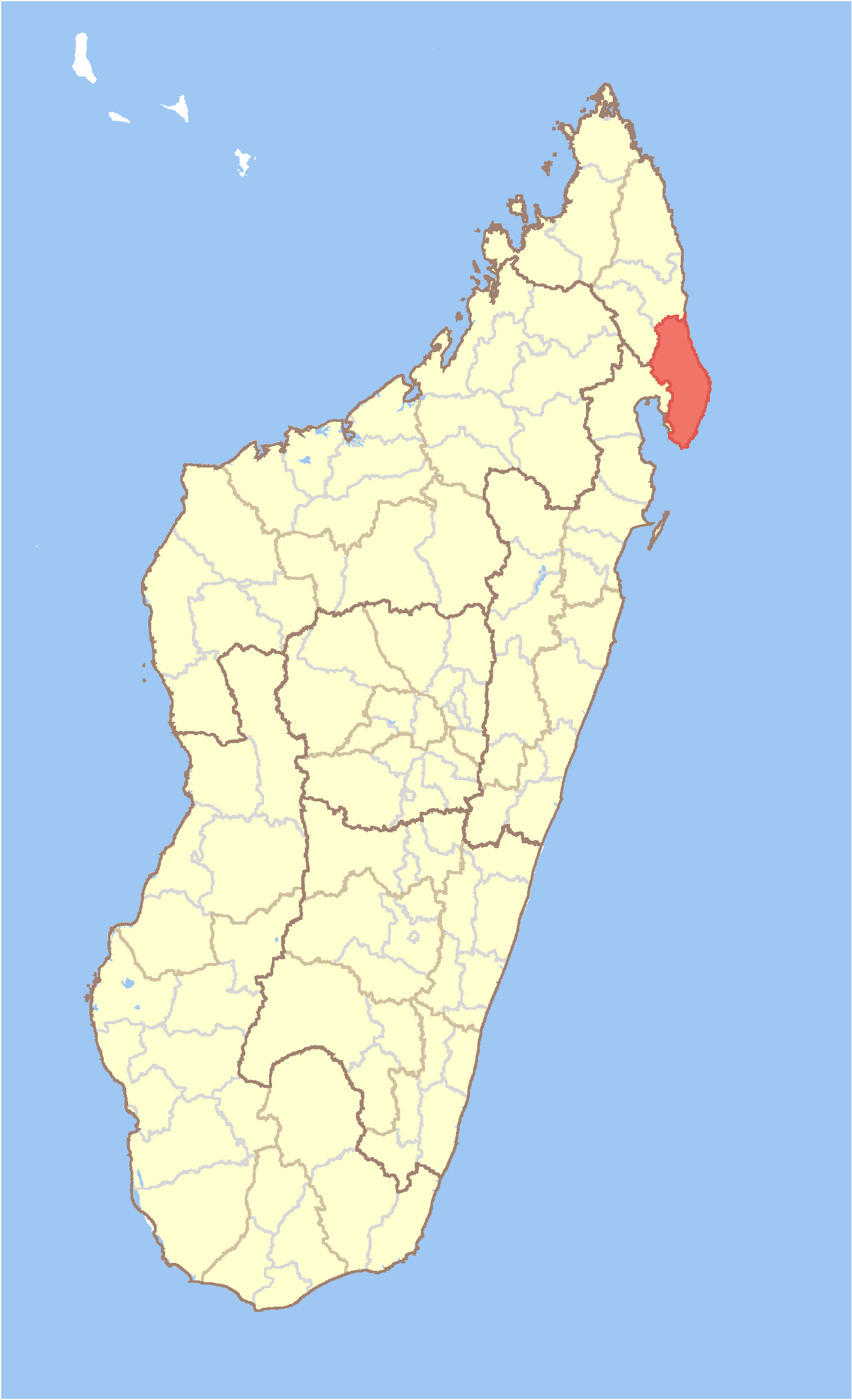
- Location in Madagascar
- Coordinates: 14°53′S 50°17′E
- Country: Madagascar
- Region: Sava

Government
  - district chief: Marie Annick Bevazaha

Area
  - Total: 6,795 km^{2} (2,624 sq mi)

Population (2018)
  - Total: 282,921
  - Density: 41.64/km^{2} (107.8/sq mi)
  - Ethnicities: Betsimisaraka
- Time zone: UTC3 (EAT)

Antalaha District is a district in northeastern Madagascar. The district contains the Masoala Peninsula, and is limited by Antongil Bay in south-west and the Indian Ocean on east. It is a part of Sava Region and borders the districts of Sambava into the north, Andapa to the north-west and Maroantsetra to the west. The area is 6,795 km^{2} (2,624 sq mi) and the population was estimated to be 222,203 in 2009 and 282,921 in 2018. At the time of the last Madagascar census in 1993 149,684 inhabitants lived in this district.

The main town and district capital is Antalaha

== Communes ==
The district is divided into 16 communes (from north to south) with population data based on projections for 2018:

- Ambalabe - 16,988 inhabitants
- Ambinanifaho - 13,307 inhabitants
- Ambohitralanana - 16,853 inhabitants
- Ampahana - 24,732 inhabitants
- Ampanavoana - 13,556 inhabitants
- Ampohibe - 27,050 inhabitants
- Andampy - 7,399 inhabitants
- Antalaha - 44,556 inhabitants
- Antananambo - 17,091 inhabitants
- Antombana - 20,659 inhabitants
- Antsahanoro - 15,847 inhabitants
- Antsambalahy - 10,946 inhabitants
- Lanjarivo - 18,861 inhabitants
- Marofinaritra - 16,930 inhabitants
- Sarahandrano - 7,097 inhabitants
- Vinanivao - 11,049 inhabitants
- Total - 282,921 inhabitants

== Infrastructures ==
The National road 5a connects the town with Sambava (81 km) and Ambilobe in the North. Antalaha has a maritime harbour. The local airport is situated at 12 km west of Antalaha.

== National Parks ==
The Masoala National Park.

== Rivers ==
The Ambinany river, Ankavanana, Onive (nord) and Ankavia.
