= Ambohitralanana =

- Location in Madagascar
- Coordinates: 15°14′S 50°27′E
- Country: Madagascar
- Region: Sava
- District: Antalaha

Population (2001)
  - Total: 17,850
- Time zone: UTC3 (EAT)

Ambohitralanana is a town and commune (Malagasy: kaominina) in northern Madagascar. It belongs to the district of Antalaha, which is a part of Sava Region. In 2001, the population was 17,850.

Ambohitralanana has a riverine harbour and schools for primary and junior high education.

As of 2001, the majority of townspeople (80%) are farmers, but only 0.6% raise livestock. The most important crops are rice and vanilla, followed by cloves and cassava. Industry and service sectors employ 1% and 0.4% of the population, respectively, while fishing employs 18%.
