= Ambalabe, Vatomandry =

- Location in Madagascar
- Coordinates: 19°13′6″S 48°38′06″E
- Country: Madagascar
- Region: Atsinanana
- District: Vatomandry (district)

Area
  - Total: 174.37 km^{2} (67.32 sq mi)
- Elevation: 350 m (1,150 ft)

Population (2019)Census
  - Total: 6,388
- Time zone: UTC3 (EAT)

Ambalabe is a rural municipality located in the Atsinanana region of eastern Madagascar, and belongs to the Vatomandry (district).

== Economy ==
The economy is based on agriculture, including coffee and cacao but also rice, maize and manioc.
