= Karol Zachar =

Karol L. Zachar (12 January 1918 in Szentantal (now Svätý Anton) – 17 December 2003 in Bratislava), born Karol Legény, was a Slovak director, actor, art director, costume designer and pedagogue. He was a performer of many characteristic and comedian Slovak and world classics roles, including works of Ivan Stodola, Jozef Gregor-Tajovský, Molière, Alexander Ostrovsky, and Aleksander Fredro.

== Selected filmography ==
- White Darkness (1948)
- St. Peter's Umbrella (1958)
