= Igor Ciel =

Slovak director, screenwriter, and actor (1931–2010

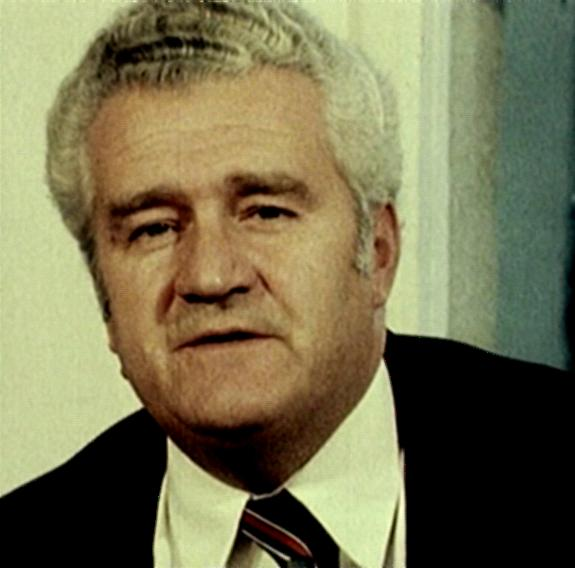
- Born: 13 April 1931; Rožňava, Czechoslovakia
- Died: 4 June 2010 (aged 79); Bratislava, Slovakia
- Occupations: Theatre director; television director; screenwriter; actor

Igor Ciel (13 April 1931 – 4 July 2010) was a Slovak film and theatre director, screenwriter, and actor.

== Life and career ==
=== Early life ===
Ciel was born in Rožňava, but lived and studied in Brezno since childhood. While at grammar school, he attended the theatre club of Janko Chalupka, where he first found his interest in theatre. His mother was an actress in amateur theatre and tried to help him during his early years.

=== Theatre ===
His interest in theatre prompted Ciel to apply to the Academy of Performing Arts in Bratislava (VŠMU), where he wanted to study theatre directing. However, he was not accepted and instead took science and theatre aesthetics at Comenius University in Bratislava. After graduating, he again applied for the same course at VŠMU and was finally accepted. Acting lessons were taught by Andrej Bagar, while he received directing lessons from Jozef Budský. He gained attention by directing the play Tanková loď by Herb Tank. Due to the recommendations of his professors, he later went to study at the Russian Academy of Theatre Arts in Moscow (GITIS). He returned to Czechoslovakia in 1955 and completed his studies. Following this, he became a radio announcer. He started directing plays in Zvolen (1955–1959) and later in Nitra (1960–1966). After leaving Nitra in 1966, he started working as a director at the Czechoslovak Television in Bratislava.

=== Czechoslovak Television ===
While at Czechoslovak Television, Ciel filmed more than one hundred and forty titles, including movies, television series, performances, and a few documentaries. For many years, he also taught at the Academy of Performing Arts in Bratislava. He worked at the faculty of theatre until 1962, and became the head of the television directing department after its opening in 1974, remaining in the position until 1985/86. In 1981, Ciel attained the title of Associate Professor and by the end of 1989, he had a full professorship. In the 1990s, he was also on the board of Slovenská televízia and served as its chairman in 1993. Towards the end of the century, he also taught at the Academy of Arts in Banská Bystrica (1998–2003).

In addition to directing and teaching, Ciel was also an actor. He debuted in 1958 in the film Posledný návrat and also appeared in a number of theatre plays.

=== Personal life and death ===
Ciel married actress Alžbeta Poláčková in 1956. They had two kids together, Hana and Martin. Hana studied dramaturgy and screenwriting at FAMU and worked with her father on various television films. Martin studied film and theatre science at VŠMU, where he works as an associate professor in the department of audiovisual studies. Igor and Martin performed together in the 2000 television film Ticho po búrke.

Igor Ciel died on 4 July 2010.
