= List of Bulbophyllum species =

Bulbophyllum Thouars 1822, is a large orchid genus that contains over 2000 epiphytic species from the orchid family Orchidaceae. The following is a list of Bulbophyllum species accepted by Plants of the World Online as at January 2019:

== Species ==
=== A ===
- Bulbophyllum abbreviatum Schltr. 1924
- Bulbophyllum abbrevilabium Carr 1932
- Bulbophyllum aberrans Schltr. 1911
- Bulbophyllum ablepharon Schltr. 1923
- Bulbophyllum absconditum J.J.Sm. 1905
  - Bulbophyllum absconditum subsp. absconditum
  - Bulbophyllum absconditum subsp. hastula J.J.Verm. 1993
- Bulbophyllum acanthoglossum Schltr. 1913
- Bulbophyllum acropogon Schltr. 1913
- Bulbophyllum acuminatum (Ridl.) Ridl. 1907: Tapering-flower Bulbophyllum
- Bulbophyllum acutibracteatum De Wild. 1921
  - Bulbophyllum acutibracteatum var. acutibracteatum
  - Bulbophyllum acutibracteatum var. rubrobrunneopapillosum (De Wild.) J.J.Verm. 1986
- Bulbophyllum acutiflorum A.Rich. 1841
- Bulbophyllum acutilingue J.J.Sm. 1908
- Bulbophyllum acutilobum J.J.Verm. & P.O'Byrne 2008
- Bulbophyllum acutispicatum H.Perrier 1951
- Bulbophyllum adangense Seidenf. 1979
- Bulbophyllum adelphidium J.J.Verm. 1993
- Bulbophyllum adenoblepharon Schltr. 1913
- Bulbophyllum adiamantinum Brade 1951
- Bulbophyllum adjungens Seidenf. 1979
- Bulbophyllum adolphii Schltr. 1921
- Bulbophyllum aechmophorum J.J.Verm. 1993
- Bulbophyllum aemulum Schltr. 1905
- Bulbophyllum aeolium Ames (1913 publ. 1914)
  - Bulbophyllum aeolium subsp. aeolium
  - Bulbophyllum aeolium subsp. padasense
- Bulbophyllum aestivale Ames 1915
- Bulbophyllum affine Wall. ex Lindl. 1830: Similar Bulbophyllum
- Bulbophyllum afzelii Schltr. 1918
  - Bulbophyllum afzelii var. afzelii
  - Bulbophyllum afzelii var. microdoron (Schltr.) Bosser 1965
- Bulbophyllum agapethoides Schltr. 1911
- Bulbophyllum agastor Garay, Hamer & Siegerist 1996: Flat Bulbophyllum
- Bulbophyllum aggregatum Besser 1965: Crowded Bulbophyllum
- Bulbophyllum aithorhachis J.J.Verm. 1996
- Bulbophyllum alabastraceus P.Royen 1979
- Bulbophyllum alagense Ames 1907: Alag River Bulbophyllum
- Bulbophyllum alatum J.J.Verm. 1991
- Bulbophyllum albibracteum Seidenf. 1979
- Bulbophyllum albidostylidium Seidenf. 1995
- Bulbophyllum albociliatum (Tang S.Liu & H.Y.Su) K.Nakaj. 1973
  - Bulbophyllum albociliatum var. albociliatum
  - Bulbophyllum albociliatum var. shanlinshiense T.P.Lin & Y.N.Chang (2013)
  - Bulbophyllum albociliatum var. weiminianum T.P.Lin & Y.N.Chang (2005)
- Bulbophyllum alboroseum Ames 1922
- Bulbophyllum alcicorne C.S.P.Parish & Rchb.f. 1874
- Bulbophyllum alexandrae Schltr. 1925: Alexander's Bulbophyllum
- Bulbophyllum algidum Ridl. 1916
- Bulbophyllum alinae Szlach.(2001)
- Bulbophyllum alkmaarense J.J.Sm. 1911
- Bulbophyllum alleizettei Schltr. 1922
- Bulbophyllum allenkerrii Seidenf. 1979: Allen Kerr's Bulbophyllum
- Bulbophyllum alliifolium J.J.Sm. 1905
- Bulbophyllum allotrion J.J.Verm. & P.O'Byrne (2008)
- Bulbophyllum alpinum (P.Royen) J.J.Verm., Schuit. & de Vogel (2014)
- Bulbophyllum alsiosum Ames 1912
- Bulbophyllum alticaule Ridl. 1916
- Bulbophyllum alticola Schltr. 1912
- Bulbophyllum alveatum J.J.Verm. 1993
- Bulbophyllum amauroloma J.J.Verm. & P.O'Byrne (2008)
- Bulbophyllum amazonicum L.O.Williams 1939
- Bulbophyllum ambatoavense Bosser 2004
- Bulbophyllum amblyacron Schltr. 1913
- Bulbophyllum amblyanthum Schltr. 1913
- Bulbophyllum ambrense H.Perrier 1937
- Bulbophyllum ambrosia (Hance) Schltr. 1919: Sweet-smelling Bulbophyllum
  - Bulbophyllum ambrosia subsp. ambrosia
  - Bulbophyllum ambrosia subsp. nepalensis J.J.Wood 1986
- Bulbophyllum amoenum Bosser 1965
- Bulbophyllum amorosoanum Naive, M.Leon & Cootes 2017
- Bulbophyllum amphorimorphum H.Perrier 1951
- Bulbophyllum amplebracteatum Teijsm. & Binn. 1862
  - Bulbophyllum amplebracteatum subsp. amplebracteatum
  - Bulbophyllum amplebracteatum subsp. carunculatum (Garay, Hamer & Siegerist) J.J.Verm. & P.O'Byrne (2011).
  - Bulbophyllum amplebracteatum subsp. orthoglossum (H.Wendl. & Kraenzl.) J.J.Verm. & P.O'Byrne (2011).
- Bulbophyllum amplifolium (Rolfe) N.P.Balakr. & Sud.Chowdhury 1968
- Bulbophyllum amplistigmaticum Kores 1989
- Bulbophyllum anaclastum J.J.Verm. 1993
- Bulbophyllum anakbaruppui J.J.Verm. & P.O'Byrne 2003
- Bulbophyllum analamazoatrae Schltr. 1924
- Bulbophyllum anascaputum Cootes, Cabactulan (2017)
- Bulbophyllum anceps Rolfe 1892
- Bulbophyllum andersonii (Hook.f.) J.J.Sm. 1912
- Bulbophyllum andohahelense H.Perrier 1939
- Bulbophyllum andreeae A.D.Hawkes 1956
- Bulbophyllum anguliferum Ames & C.Schweinf. in O.Ames 1920: Angle-carrying Bulbophyllum
- Bulbophyllum angusteovatum Seidenf. 1979
- Bulbophyllum angustifolium (Blume) Lindl. 1830
- Bulbophyllum angustipetalum (Seidenf.) J.J.Verm., Schuit. & de Vogel (2014)
- Bulbophyllum anisopterum J.J.Verm. & P.O'Byrne 2003
- Bulbophyllum anjae J.J.Verm. & de Vogel (2014)
- Bulbophyllum anjozorobeense Bosser 2000
- Bulbophyllum ankaizinense (Jum. & Perrier) Schltr. 1924: Ankaizine Bulbophyllum
- Bulbophyllum ankaratranum Schltr. 1924
- Bulbophyllum ankerae J.J.Verm. & P.O'Byrne (2011)
- Bulbophyllum ankylochele J.J.Verm. 1993
- Bulbophyllum ankylodon J.J.Verm. & P.O'Byrne (2008)
- Bulbophyllum ankylorhinon J.J.Verm. 1992
- Bulbophyllum annamense (Garay) Sieder & Kiehn (2009)
- Bulbophyllum annandalei Ridl. 1920
- Bulbophyllum anodon J.J.Verm., Thavipoke & J.Phelps (2014)
- Bulbophyllum antennatum Schltr. in K.M.Schumann & C.A.G.Lauterbach 1905
- Bulbophyllum antenniferum (Lindl.) Rchb.f. in W.G.Walpers 1861
- Bulbophyllum antheae (J.J.Verm. & A.L.Lamb) J.J.Verm., Schuit. & de Vogel (2014)
- Bulbophyllum antioquiense Kraenzl. 1899
- Bulbophyllum antongilense Schltr. 1924
- Bulbophyllum apertum Schltr. 1906
- Bulbophyllum apetalum Lindl. (1862)
- Bulbophyllum aphanopetalum Schltr. 1906
- Bulbophyllum apheles J.J.Verm. 1991
- Bulbophyllum apiculatum Schltr. 1913
- Bulbophyllum apiferum Carr 1930
- Bulbophyllum apodum Hook.f. 1890: Bulbless Bulbophyllum
- Bulbophyllum apoense Schuit. & de Vogel 2003
- Bulbophyllum appendiculatum (Rolfe) J.J.Sm. 1912
- Bulbophyllum appressicaule Ridl. 1917
- Bulbophyllum appressum Schltr. 1913
- Bulbophyllum approximatum Ridl. 1886
- Bulbophyllum aquinoi (Cootes, M.Leon & Naive) J.M.H.Shaw (2017)
- Bulbophyllum arachnites Ridl. (1909)
- Bulbophyllum araiophyllum J.J.Verm., Schuit. & de Vogel (2014)
- Bulbophyllum arcaniflorum Ridl. 1916
- Bulbophyllum arcuatilabium Aver. 1999
- Bulbophyllum ardjunense J.J.Sm. 1927
- Bulbophyllum arfakense J.J.Sm. in L.S.Gibbs 1917
- Bulbophyllum arfakianum Kraenzl. 1904
- Bulbophyllum argoxanthum J.J.Verm. (2008)
- Bulbophyllum argyropus (Endl.) Rchb.f. 1876 – silver strand orchid
- Bulbophyllum arianeae Fraga & E.C.Smidt 2004
- Bulbophyllum aristatum (Rchb.f.) Hemsl. 1884
- Bulbophyllum aristilabre J.J.Sm. 1912
- Bulbophyllum aristopetalum Kores 1989
- Bulbophyllum armeniacum J.J.Sm. 1917
- Bulbophyllum arminii Sieder & Kiehn (2009)
- Bulbophyllum arrectum Kraenzl. 1921
- Bulbophyllum arsoanum J.J.Sm. 1912
- Bulbophyllum artostigma J.J.Verm. 1993
- Bulbophyllum artvogelii J.J.Verm., P.O'Byrne & A.L.Lamb (2015)
- Bulbophyllum arunachalense (A.N.Rao) J.J.Verm., Schuit. & de Vogel (2014)
- Bulbophyllum aschemon J.J.Verm. & A.L.Lamb (2008)
- Bulbophyllum ascochiloides J.J.Sm. 1927
- Bulbophyllum ascochilum J.J.Verm. (2008)
- Bulbophyllum asperilingue Schltr. 1919
- Bulbophyllum aspersum J.J.Sm. 1912
- Bulbophyllum astelidum Aver. 1994
- Bulbophyllum atratum J.J.Sm. 1917
- Bulbophyllum atrolabium Schltr. 1923
- Bulbophyllum atropurpureum Barb.Rodr. 1877: Black-purple Bulbophyllum
- Bulbophyllum atrorubens Schltr. 1906
- Bulbophyllum atrosanguineum Aver. 2003
- Bulbophyllum atroviride J.J.Verm. (2008)
- Bulbophyllum attenuatum Rolfe 1896: Dagger-shaped Bulbophyllum
- Bulbophyllum aubrevillei Bosser 1965
- Bulbophyllum aundense Ormerod (2005)
- Bulbophyllum auratum (Lindl.) Rchb.f. in W.G.Walpers 1861
- Bulbophyllum aureoapex Schltr. 1913
- Bulbophyllum aureobrunneum Schltr. 1913
- Bulbophyllum aureum (Hook.f.) J.J.Sm. 1912: Golden Bulbophyllum
- Bulbophyllum auricomum Lindl. 1830
- Bulbophyllum auriculatum J.J.Verm. & P.O'Byrne 2003
- Bulbophyllum auriflorum H.Perrier 1937
- Bulbophyllum auritum J.J.Verm. & P.O'Byrne (2008)
- Bulbophyllum auroreum J.J.Sm. 1928
- Bulbophyllum australe (Seidenf.) J.J.Verm., Schuit. & de Vogel (2014)
- Bulbophyllum averyanovii Seidenf. 1992
- Bulbophyllum ayuthayense J.J.Verm., Schuit. & de Vogel (2014)

=== B ===
- Bulbophyllum bacilliferum J.J.Sm. 1928
- Bulbophyllum baculiferum Ridl. 1916
- Bulbophyllum baileyi F.Muell. 1875 - fruit fly orchid
- Bulbophyllum bakoense J.J.Verm. & A.L.Lamb (2008)
- Bulbophyllum baladeanum J.J.Sm. 1912
- Bulbophyllum balgooiji J.J.Verm., Schuit. & de Vogel (2014)
- Bulbophyllum ballii P.J.Cribb 1977
- Bulbophyllum bandischii Garay 1992
- Bulbophyllum bantaengense (J.J.Sm.) J.J.Verm. & P.O'Byrne (2011)
- Bulbophyllum barbasapientis J.J.Verm. & P.O'Byrne (2008)
- Bulbophyllum barbatum Barb.Rodr. 1882
- Bulbophyllum barbavagabundum J.J.Verm. (2008)
- Bulbophyllum barbigerum Lindl. 1837: Bearded Bulbophyllum
- Bulbophyllum bariense Gagnep. 1930: Bari Bulbophyllum
- Bulbophyllum baronii Ridl. 1885
- Bulbophyllum basisetum J.J.Sm. 1929
- Bulbophyllum bathieanum Schltr. 1916
- Bulbophyllum bavonis J.J.Verm. 1984
- Bulbophyllum beccarii Rchb.f. 1879: Beccar's Bulbophyllum
- Bulbophyllum belonaeglossum J.J.Verm. & A.L.Lamb (2008)
- Bulbophyllum belopetalum J.J.Verm., P.O'Byrne & A.L.Lamb (2015)
- Bulbophyllum berenicis Rchb.f. 1880
- Bulbophyllum bernadetteae J.-B.Castillon (2012)
- Bulbophyllum betchei F.Muell. 1881
- Bulbophyllum biantennatum Schltr. 1913
- Bulbophyllum bicarinatum J.J.Verm. & A.L.Lamb (2013)
- Bulbophyllum bicaudatum Schltr. 1913
- Bulbophyllum bicolor Lindl. 1830
- Bulbophyllum bicoloratum Schltr. 1924
- Bulbophyllum bidentatum (Barb.Rodr.) Cogn. in C.F.P.von Martius & auct. suc. (eds.) 1902
- Bulbophyllum bidenticulatum J.J.Verm. 1984
  - Bulbophyllum bidenticulatum subsp. bidenticulatum
  - Bulbophyllum bidenticulatum subsp. joyceae J.J.Verm. 1987
- Bulbophyllum bidoupense Aver. & Duy (2015)
- Bulbophyllum bifarium Lindl. 1864
- Bulbophyllum biflorum Teijsm. & Binn. 1855: Two-flowered Bulbophyllum
- Bulbophyllum bifurcatoflorens (Fukuy.) J.J.Verm., Schuit. & de Vogel (2014)
- Bulbophyllum bigibbosum J.J.Sm. 1913
- Bulbophyllum bigibbum Schltr. 1923
- Bulbophyllum bilobipetalum J.J.Sm. (1927)
- Bulbophyllum birmense Schltr. 1910
- Bulbophyllum bisepalum Schltr. in K.M.Schumann & C.A.G.Lauterbach 1905
- Bulbophyllum biseriale Carr 1930
- Bulbophyllum biserratum J.J.Verm. (2008)
- Bulbophyllum bisetoides Seidenf. 1970
- Bulbophyllum bisetum Lindl. 1842
- Bulbophyllum bismarckense Schltr. in K.M.Schumann & C.A.G.Lauterbach 1905
- Bulbophyllum bittnerianum Schltr. 1910
- Bulbophyllum blaoense Tich & Diep ex Aver. & Tich (2015)
- Bulbophyllum blepharistes Rchb.f. 1872: Fringed Bulbophyllum
- Bulbophyllum blepharocardium Schltr. (1913)
- Bulbophyllum blepharochilum Garay 1999: Lip-fringe Bulbophyllum
- Bulbophyllum blepharopetalum Schltr. 1913
- Bulbophyllum bliteum J.J.Verm. 1993
- Bulbophyllum bohnkeanum Campacci (2008)
- Bulbophyllum boiteaui H.Perrier 1939
- Bulbophyllum bolivianum Schltr. 1922
- Bulbophyllum bolsteri Ames 1912
- Bulbophyllum bombycinum J.J.Verm. (2008)
- Bulbophyllum bomiense Z.H.Tsi 1978
- Bulbophyllum bonaccordense (C.S.Kumar) J.J.Verm. (2014)
- Bulbophyllum boninense (Schltr.) J.J.Sm. 1912
- Bulbophyllum bontocense Ames 1912
- Bulbophyllum boonjee B.Gray & D.L.Jones 1984 – maroon strand orchid
- Bulbophyllum boosii J.J.Verm. & Kindler (2015)
- Bulbophyllum bootanense C.S.P.Parish & Rchb.f. 1874
- Bulbophyllum botryophorum Ridl. 1897
- Bulbophyllum boudetianum Fraga 2004
- Bulbophyllum boulbetii Tixier 1966
- Bulbophyllum bowkettiae F.M.Bailey 1884 – striped snake orchid
- Bulbophyllum brachiatum (Schltr.) J.J.Verm., Schuit. & de Vogel (2014)
- Bulbophyllum brachychilum Schltr. 1913
- Bulbophyllum brachypetalum Schltr. 1913
- Bulbophyllum brachyphyton Schltr. 1918
- Bulbophyllum brachypus (Schltr.) J.J.Verm., Schuit. & de Vogel (2014)
- Bulbophyllum brachyrhopalon J.J.Verm., P.O'Byrne & A.L.Lamb (2015)
- Bulbophyllum brachystachyum Schltr. 1924
- Bulbophyllum brachytriche J.J.Verm. & P.O'Byrne (2008)
- Bulbophyllum bracteatum F.M.Bailey 1891 – blotched pineapple orchid
- Bulbophyllum bracteolatum Lindl. 1838
- Bulbophyllum bractescens Rolfe ex Kerr 1927
- Bulbophyllum brassii J.J.Verm. 1993
- Bulbophyllum breimerianum J.J.Verm. & A.Vogel (2007)
- Bulbophyllum breve Schltr. 1913
- Bulbophyllum brevibrachiatum (Schltr.) J.J.Sm. 1912
- Bulbophyllum brevicolumna J.J.Verm. 1991
- Bulbophyllum brevilabium Schltr. 1913
- Bulbophyllum brevipedunculatum T.C.Hsu & S.W.Chung (2008)
- Bulbophyllum brevipes Ridl. 1898
- Bulbophyllum brevipetalum H.Perrier 1937
- Bulbophyllum brevispicatum Z.H.Tsi & S.C.Chen 1994
- Bulbophyllum brienianum (Rolfe) Merr. 1921
- Bulbophyllum bruneiense J.J.Verm. & A.L.Lamb (2008)
- Bulbophyllum bryoides Guillaumin 1957
- Bulbophyllum bryophilum Hermans (2007)
- Bulbophyllum bryophytoides G.A.Fisch. & Andriant. (2009)
- Bulbophyllum bulhartii Sieder & Kiehn (2009).
- Bulbophyllum bulliferum J.J.Sm. 1908
- Bulbophyllum burfordiense Garay, Hamer & Siegerist 1996: Burford Bulbophyllum
- Bulbophyllum burttii Summerh. 1953

=== C ===
- Bulbophyllum caecilii J.J.Sm. 1927
- Bulbophyllum caecum J.J.Sm. 1926
- Bulbophyllum caespitosum Thouars 1822
- Bulbophyllum calceilabium J.J.Sm. 1929
- Bulbophyllum calceolus J.J.Verm. 1991
- Bulbophyllum caldericola G.F.Walsh 1993
- Bulbophyllum calimanianum (2007)
- Bulbophyllum callichroma Schltr. 1913: Green-Calli Bulbophyllum
- Bulbophyllum calliferum J.J.Verm. & A.L.Lamb (2013)
- Bulbophyllum callipes J.J.Sm. 1908
- Bulbophyllum callosum Bosser 1965: Callous Bulbophyllum
- Bulbophyllum caloglossum Schltr. 1913: Beautiful-lipped Bulbophyllum
- Bulbophyllum calviventer J.J.Verm. 1993
- Bulbophyllum calvum Summerh. 1966
- Bulbophyllum calyptogyne J.J.Verm. & P.O'Byrne (2011).
- Bulbophyllum calyptratum Kraenzl. 1895: Hooded Bulbophyllum
  - Bulbophyllum calyptratum var. calyptratum
  - Bulbophyllum calyptratum var. graminifolium (Summerh.) J.J.Verm. 1986
  - Bulbophyllum calyptratum var. lucifugum (Summerh.) J.J.Verm. 1987
- Bulbophyllum calyptropus Schltr. 1924
- Bulbophyllum cambodianum (Christenson) J.J.Verm., Schuit. & de Vogel (2014).
- Bulbophyllum cameronense Garay, Hamer & Siegerist 1996: Cameron Highlands Bulbophyllum
- Bulbophyllum campanuliflorum J.J.Verm., Schuit. & de Vogel (2014).
- Bulbophyllum campos-portoi Brade 1951
- Bulbophyllum camptochilum J.J.Verm. 1996
- Bulbophyllum candidum Hook.f. 1890
- Bulbophyllum canlaonense Ames 1912
- Bulbophyllum cantagallense (Barb.Rodr.) Cogn. in C.F.P.von Martius & auct. suc. (eds.) 1902
- Bulbophyllum capilligerum J.J.Sm. 1927
- Bulbophyllum capillipes C.S.P.Parish & Rchb.f. 1874
- Bulbophyllum capitatum (Blume) Lindl. 1830
- Bulbophyllum capituliflorum Rolfe 1906
- Bulbophyllum capnophyton J.J.Verm., Schuit. & de Vogel (2014)
- Bulbophyllum capuronii Bosser 1971
- Bulbophyllum caputgnomonis J.J.Verm. 1993
- Bulbophyllum carassense R.C.Mota, F.Barros & Stehmann (2009)
- Bulbophyllum cardiobulbum Bosser 1965
- Bulbophyllum cardiophyllum J.J.Verm. 1991
- Bulbophyllum careyanum (Hook.) Spreng. 1826: Carey's Bulbophyllum
- Bulbophyllum cariniflorum Rchb.f. in W.G.Walpers 1861
- Bulbophyllum carinilabium J.J.Verm. 1991
- Bulbophyllum carnosilabium Summerh. (1953 publ. 1954).
- Bulbophyllum carnosisepalum J.J.Verm. 1986
- Bulbophyllum carrianum J.J.Verm. 2000
- Bulbophyllum cataractarum Schltr. 1924
- Bulbophyllum catenarium Ridl. 1894: Chain-like Bulbophyllum
- Bulbophyllum catenulatum Kraenzl. 1921: Chain-shaped Bulbophyllum
- Bulbophyllum cateorum J.J.Verm. 1992
- Bulbophyllum catillus J.J.Verm. & P.O'Byrne 2003
- Bulbophyllum caudatisepalum Ames & C.Schweinf. in O.Ames 1920
- Bulbophyllum caudatum Lindl. (1830).
- Bulbophyllum caudipetalum J.J.Sm. 1913
- Bulbophyllum cauliflorum Hook.f. 1890
  - Bulbophyllum cauliflorum var. cauliflorum
  - Bulbophyllum cauliflorum var. sikkimense N.Pearce & P.J.Cribb 2001
- Bulbophyllum cavibulbum J.J.Sm. 1929
- Bulbophyllum cavipes J.J.Verm. 1996
- Bulbophyllum centrosemiflorum J.J.Sm. 1912
- Bulbophyllum cephalophorum Garay, Hamer & Siegerist 1996: Spherical-inflorescence Bulbophyllum
- Bulbophyllum cerambyx J.J.Sm. 1915
- Bulbophyllum ceratostylis J.J.Sm. 1904
- Bulbophyllum cercanthum (Garay, Hamer & Siegerist) J.M.H.Shaw (2009).
- Bulbophyllum cerebellum J.J.Verm. 1996
- Bulbophyllum cerinum Schltr. 1913
- Bulbophyllum ceriodorum Boiteau 1942
- Bulbophyllum cernuum (Blume) Lindl. 1830: Nodding Bulbophyllum
- Bulbophyllum chaetostroma Schltr. 1913
- Bulbophyllum chalcochloron J.J.Verm. (2008).
- Bulbophyllum chanii J.J.Verm. & A.L.Lamb 1991
- Bulbophyllum chaunobulbon Schltr. 1913
- Bulbophyllum cheiri Lindl. 1844
  - Bulbophyllum cheiri subsp. cheiri
  - Bulbophyllum cheiri subsp. subuliferum (Schltr.) J.J.Verm., P.O'Byrne & A.L.Lamb (2015)
- Bulbophyllum cheiropetalum Ridl. 1926
- Bulbophyllum × chikukwa Fibeck & Mavi (2000 publ. 2001).
- Bulbophyllum chimaera Schltr. 1913: Chimarea Bulbophyllum
- Bulbophyllum chinense (Lindl.) Rchb.f. in W.G.Walpers 1861
- Bulbophyllum chloranthum Schltr. in K.M.Schumann & C.A.G.Lauterbach 1905: Green-blooming Bulbophyllum
- Bulbophyllum chlorascens J.J.Sm. 1927
- Bulbophyllum chloroglossum Rchb.f. 1871
- Bulbophyllum chlorolirion J.J.Verm. (2008)
- Bulbophyllum chloropterum Rchb.f. 1850
- Bulbophyllum chlororhopalon Schltr. 1913
- Bulbophyllum chondriophorum (Gagnep.) Seidenf. (1973 publ. 1974)
- Bulbophyllum chrysanthum J.J.Verm. (2008)
- Bulbophyllum chrysendetum Ames 1915
- Bulbophyllum chrysocephalum Schltr. 1911
- Bulbophyllum chrysochilum Schltr. 1912
- Bulbophyllum chrysoglossum Schltr. in K.M.Schumann & C.A.G.Lauterbach 1905
- Bulbophyllum chrysotes Schltr. 1913
- Bulbophyllum chthonochroma J.J.Verm. & Sieder (2015)
- Bulbophyllum ciliatilabrum H.Perrier 1937
- Bulbophyllum ciliatum (Blume) Lindl. 1830
- Bulbophyllum ciliipetalum Schltr. 1913
- Bulbophyllum ciliolatum Schltr. 1913
- Bulbophyllum ciluliae Bianch. & J.A.N.Bat. (2004)
- Bulbophyllum cimicinum J.J.Verm. 1982
- Bulbophyllum × cipoense Borba & Semir 1998
- Bulbophyllum cirrhoglossum H.Perrier 1951
- Bulbophyllum cirrhosum L.O.Williams 1940
- Bulbophyllum citrellum Ridl. 1916
- Bulbophyllum citricolor J.J.Sm. 1932
- Bulbophyllum citrinilabre J.J.Sm. 1913
- Bulbophyllum clandestinum Lindl. 1841: Close-sitting Bulbophyllum
- Bulbophyllum claptonense (Rolfe) Rolfe (1905)
- Bulbophyllum claussenii Rchb.f. 1846
- Bulbophyllum clavatum Thouars 1822
- Bulbophyllum clavuliflorum J.J.Verm. & A.L.Lamb (2008)
- Bulbophyllum cleistogamum Ridl. 1896: Self-fertilizing Bulbophyllum
- Bulbophyllum clemensiae Ames 1912
- Bulbophyllum clemensiorum J.J.Verm., Schuit. & de Vogel (2014)
- Bulbophyllum clinocoryphe J.J.Verm., P.O'Byrne & A.L.Lamb (2015)
- Bulbophyllum clinopus J.J.Verm. & P.O'Byrne (2008)
- Bulbophyllum clipeibulbum J.J.Verm. 2001
- Bulbophyllum coccinatum H.Perrier 1938
- Bulbophyllum cochleatum Lindl. 1862
  - Bulbophyllum cochleatum var. bequaertii (De Wild.) J.J.Verm. 1986
  - Bulbophyllum cochleatum var. brachyanthum (Summerh.) J.J.Verm. 1986
  - Bulbophyllum cochleatum var. cochleatum: Mann's Bulbophyllum
  - Bulbophyllum cochleatum var. tenuicaule (Lindl.) J.J.Verm. 1986
- Bulbophyllum cochlia Garay, Hamer & Siegerist 1994
- Bulbophyllum cochlioides J.J.Sm. 1929
- Bulbophyllum cocoinum Bateman ex Lindl. 1837: Coconut Bulbophyllum
- Bulbophyllum codonanthum Schltr. 1911
- Bulbophyllum coelochilum J.J.Verm. 1991
- Bulbophyllum cogniauxianum (Kraenzl.) J.J.Sm. 1912
- Bulbophyllum coiloglossum Schltr. in K.M.Schumann & C.A.G.Lauterbach (1905)
- Bulbophyllum collettii King & Pantl. 1897
- Bulbophyllum colliferum J.J.Sm. 1911
- Bulbophyllum collinum Schltr. 1913
- Bulbophyllum coloratum J.J.Sm. 1910
- Bulbophyllum colubrimodum Ames1923
- Bulbophyllum colubrinum (Rchb.f.) Rchb.f. in W.G.Walpers 1861
- Bulbophyllum comatum Lindl. 1862
  - Bulbophyllum comatum var. comatum
  - Bulbophyllum comatum var. inflatum (Rolfe) J.J.Verm. 1986
- Bulbophyllum comberi J.J.Verm. in J.B.Comber 1990: Comber's Bulbophyllum
- Bulbophyllum comberipictum J.J.Verm. 2002
- Bulbophyllum cominsii Rolfe (1895)
- Bulbophyllum commersonii Thouars 1822
- Bulbophyllum commissibulbum J.J.Sm. 1929
- Bulbophyllum comorianum H.Perrier 1938: Comoros Islands Bulbophyllum
- Bulbophyllum comosum Collett & Hemsl. 1890
- Bulbophyllum complanatum H.Perrier 1937
- Bulbophyllum compressilabellatum P.Royen 1979
- Bulbophyllum compressum Teijsm. & Binn. 1862
- Bulbophyllum comptonii Rendle 1921
- Bulbophyllum concatenatum P.J.Cribb & P.Taylor 1980
- Bulbophyllum concavibasalis P.Royen 1979
- Bulbophyllum concavilabium P.O'Byrne & P.T.Ong (2014)
- Bulbophyllum conchidioides Ridl. 1886
- Bulbophyllum conchophyllum J.J.Sm. 1912
- Bulbophyllum concinnum Hook.f. 1890
- Bulbophyllum concolor J.J.Sm. 1914
- Bulbophyllum condensatum J.J.Verm. (2008)
- Bulbophyllum condylochilum J.J.Verm. & P.O'Byrne (2008)
- Bulbophyllum confragosum T.P.Lin & Y.N.Chang (2013)
- Bulbophyllum congestiflorum Ridl. 1917
- Bulbophyllum coniferum Ridl. 1909
- Bulbophyllum connatum Carr 1933
- Bulbophyllum consimile J.J.Verm. & P.O'Byrne (2008)
- Bulbophyllum conspectum J.J.Sm. (1927)
- Bulbophyllum conspersum J.J.Sm. 1913
- Bulbophyllum contortisepalum J.J.Sm. 1912
- Bulbophyllum cootesii M.A.Clem. (1999-2000 publ. 1999): Cootes' Bulbophyllum
- Bulbophyllum corallinum Tixier & Guillaumin 1963
- Bulbophyllum cordemoyi Frapp. ex Cordem. 1895
- Bulbophyllum coriophorum Ridl. 1886: Bug-smelling Bulbophyllum
- Bulbophyllum cornu-cervi King 1895
- Bulbophyllum cornu-ovis Rysy (2011)
- Bulbophyllum cornutum (Blume) Rchb.f. in W.G.Walpers 1861: Horned Bulbophyllum
- Bulbophyllum corolliferum J.J.Sm. 1917
- Bulbophyllum corrugatum J.J.Verm. (2008)
- Bulbophyllum corticicola Schltr. (1910)
- Bulbophyllum corythium N.Hall 1981
- Bulbophyllum coweniorum J.J.Verm. & P.O'Byrne 2003: Cowen's Bulbophyllum
- Bulbophyllum crabro (C.S.P.Parish & Rchb.f.) J.J.Verm., Schuit. & de Vogel (2014)
- Bulbophyllum crassicaudatum Ames & C.Schweinf. in O.Ames (1920)
- Bulbophyllum crassifolium Thwaites ex Trimen 1885: Thick-leafed Bulbophyllum
- Bulbophyllum crassinervium J.J.Sm. 1900
- Bulbophyllum crassipes Hook.f. 1890: Thick-spurred Bulbophyllum
- Bulbophyllum crassipetalum H.Perrier 1937
- Bulbophyllum crenilabium W.Kittr. (1984 publ. 1985).
- Bulbophyllum crepidiferum J.J.Sm. 1920
- Bulbophyllum croceodon J.J.Verm. & P.O'Byrne (2008).
- Bulbophyllum croceum (Blume) Lindl. 1830: Saffron-yellow Bulbophyllum
- Bulbophyllum crocodilus J.J.Sm. 1912
- Bulbophyllum cruciatum J.J.Sm. 1911
- Bulbophyllum cruciferum J.J.Sm. 1917
- Bulbophyllum cruentum Garay, Hamer & Siegerist 1992: Blood-red Bulbophyllum
- Bulbophyllum cruttwellii J.J.Verm. 1993
- Bulbophyllum cryptanthoides J.J.Sm. 1912
- Bulbophyllum cryptanthum Cogn. 1899
- Bulbophyllum cryptophoranthus Garay 1999
- Bulbophyllum cryptostachyum Schltr. 1924
- Bulbophyllum cubicum Ames 1922
- Bulbophyllum culex Ridl. 1916
- Bulbophyllum cumberlegei (Seidenf.) J.J.Verm., Schuit. & de Vogel (2014)
- Bulbophyllum cumingii (Lindl.) Rchb.f. in W.G.Walpers 1861
- Bulbophyllum cuneatum Rolfe ex Ames 1905
- Bulbophyllum cuniculiforme J.J.Sm. 1911
- Bulbophyllum cupreum Lindl. 1838: Copper-colored Bulbophyllum
- Bulbophyllum curranii Ames 1912
- Bulbophyllum curvibulbum Frapp. ex Cordem. 1895
- Bulbophyllum curvicaule Schltr. 1913
- Bulbophyllum curvifolium Schltr. 1916
- Bulbophyllum curvimentatum J.J.Verm. 1984
- Bulbophyllum cuspidipetalum J.J.Sm. 1908: Lanceolate-leafed Bulbophyllum
- Bulbophyllum cyanotriche J.J.Verm. 1996
- Bulbophyllum cyatheicola (P.Royen) J.J.Verm., Schuit. & de Vogel (2014)
- Bulbophyllum cyclanthum Schltr. 1916
- Bulbophyllum cycloglossum Schltr. 1913
- Bulbophyllum cyclopense J.J.Sm. 1912
- Bulbophyllum cyclophoroides J.J.Sm. 1928
- Bulbophyllum cyclophyllum Schltr. 1913
- Bulbophyllum cylindraceum Wall. ex Lindl. 1830: Cylindrical Bulbophyllum
- Bulbophyllum cylindricum King 1895
- Bulbophyllum cylindrobulbum Schltr. in K.M.Schumann & C.A.G.Lauterbach 1905
- Bulbophyllum cylindrocarpum Frapp. ex Cordem. 1895
  - Bulbophyllum cylindrocarpum var. andringitrense Bosser 2000
  - Bulbophyllum cylindrocarpum var. aurantiacum Frapp. ex Cordem. 1895
  - Bulbophyllum cylindrocarpum var. cylindrocarpum
  - Bulbophyllum cylindrocarpum var. olivaceum Frapp. ex Cordem. 1895
- Bulbophyllum cymbidioides J.J.Verm. & P.O'Byrne (2008)
- Bulbophyllum cymbochilum J.J.Verm. & P.O'Byrne (2008)
- Bulbophyllum cyrtognomom J.J.Verm. & A.L.Lamb (2008)
- Bulbophyllum cyrtophyllum J.J.Verm. (2008)

=== D ===
- Bulbophyllum dacruzii Campacci (2010)
- Bulbophyllum dalatense Gagnep. 1930
- Bulbophyllum danii Perez-Vera 2003
- Bulbophyllum dasypetalum Rolfe ex Ames 1905
- Bulbophyllum dasystachys J.J.Verm. (2014)
- Bulbophyllum davidii (Cootes & Boos) J.M.H.Shaw (2017)
- Bulbophyllum dawongense J.J.Sm. 1934
- Bulbophyllum dayanum Rchb.f. 1865: Day's Bulbophyllum
- Bulbophyllum dearei (Rchb.f.) Rchb.f. 1888: Deare's Bulbophyllum
- Bulbophyllum debile Bosser (1989 publ. 1990).
- Bulbophyllum debrincatiae J.J.Verm. 2002
- Bulbophyllum debruynii J.J.Sm. 1929
- Bulbophyllum decarhopalon Schltr. 1913
- Bulbophyllum decaryanum H.Perrier 1937: Decary's Bulbophyllum
- Bulbophyllum decatriche J.J.Verm. 1991
- Bulbophyllum decumbens Schltr. 1913
- Bulbophyllum decurrentilobum J.J.Verm. & P.O'Byrne 2003
- Bulbophyllum decurviscapum J.J.Sm. 1932: Pendant Bulbophyllum
- Bulbophyllum decurvulum Schltr. 1912
- Bulbophyllum dekockii J.J.Sm. 1911
- Bulbophyllum delicatulum Schltr. 1911
- Bulbophyllum delitescens Hance 1876
- Bulbophyllum deltoideum Ames & C.Schweinf. in O.Ames 1920
- Bulbophyllum deminutum J.J.Sm. 1927
- Bulbophyllum dempoense J.J.Sm. 1920
- Bulbophyllum dendrobioides J.J.Sm. 1913
- Bulbophyllum dendrochiloides Schltr. 1913
- Bulbophyllum dennisii J.J.Wood 1983: Dennis' Bulbophyllum
- Bulbophyllum densibulbum W.Kittr. (1984 publ. [1985).
- Bulbophyllum densifolium Schltr. 1913
- Bulbophyllum densum Thouars 1822
- Bulbophyllum denticulatum Rolfe 1891
- Bulbophyllum dependens Schltr. 1913
- Bulbophyllum depressum King & Pantl. 1897
- Bulbophyllum desmotrichoides Schltr. 1913
- Bulbophyllum deuterodischorense J.M.H.Shaw (2014)
- Bulbophyllum deviantiae J.J.Verm. & P.O'Byrne (2008)
- Bulbophyllum devium J.B.Comber 1990
- Bulbophyllum devogelii J.J.Verm. 1991
- Bulbophyllum dewildei J.J.Verm. 1996
- Bulbophyllum dhaninivatii Seidenf. 1965
- Bulbophyllum dianthum Schltr. 1911
- Bulbophyllum dibothron J.J.Verm. & A.L.Lamb 1994
- Bulbophyllum dichaeoides Schltr. 1913
- Bulbophyllum dichilus Schltr. 1913
- Bulbophyllum dichotomum J.J.Sm. 1908
- Bulbophyllum dichromum Rolfe (1907)
- Bulbophyllum dickasonii Seidenf. 1979
- Bulbophyllum dictyoneuron Schltr. 1913
- Bulbophyllum didymotropis Seidenf. 1979
- Bulbophyllum digitatum J.J.Sm. (1911)
- Bulbophyllum digoelense J.J.Sm. 1911
- Bulbophyllum dijkstalianum (2010)
- Bulbophyllum diplantherum Carr 1932
- Bulbophyllum diplohelix J.J.Verm. & Rysy (2014)
- Bulbophyllum dischidiifolium J.J.Sm. 1909
- Bulbophyllum dischorense Schltr. 1913
- Bulbophyllum disciflorum Rolfe (1895)
- Bulbophyllum discilabium H.Perrier 1951
- Bulbophyllum discolor Schltr. 1913
  - Bulbophyllum discolor subsp. cubitale J.J.Verm. 1993
  - Bulbophyllum discolor subsp. discolor
- Bulbophyllum disjunctum Ames & C.Schweinf. in O.Ames 1920
- Bulbophyllum dissitiflorum Seidenf. 1979
- Bulbophyllum dissolutum Ames, Philipp. J. Sci., C 8: 4249 (1913 publ. 1914).
- Bulbophyllum distichobulbum P.J.Cribb 1995
- Bulbophyllum distichum Schltr. 1913
- Bulbophyllum divaricatum H.Perrier 1937
- Bulbophyllum divergens J.J.Verm. & P.O'Byrne (2011).
- Bulbophyllum djamuense Schltr. 1913
- Bulbophyllum dolabriforme J.J.Verm. 1987
- Bulbophyllum dolichodon J.J.Verm., P.O'Byrne & A.L.Lamb (2015)
- Bulbophyllum dolichoglottis Schltr. 1912
- Bulbophyllum dolichopus J.J.Verm., Schuit. & de Vogel (2014)
- Bulbophyllum doryphoroide Ames 1915
- Bulbophyllum dracunculus J.J.Verm. 2000
- Bulbophyllum dransfieldii J.J.Verm. 1991
- Bulbophyllum drepananthum J.J.Verm., de Vogel & A.Vogel (2010).
- Bulbophyllum drepanosepalum J.J.Verm. & P.O'Byrne 1993
- Bulbophyllum dryadum Schltr. 1913
- Bulbophyllum dryas Ridl. 1915
- Bulbophyllum drymoda J.J.Verm., Schuit. & de Vogel (2014).
- Bulbophyllum drymoglossum Maxim. 1887
- Bulbophyllum dschischungarense Schltr. 1913
- Bulbophyllum dulongjiangense X.H.Jin (2006).
- Bulbophyllum dunstervillei Garay 1976
- Bulbophyllum dusenii Kraenzl. 1911

=== E ===
- Bulbophyllum ebracteolatum Kraenzl. 1916
- Bulbophyllum echinochilum Kraenzl. 1921
- Bulbophyllum echinolabium J.J.Sm. 1934
- Bulbophyllum echinulus Seidenf. 1982:
- Bulbophyllum eciliatum Schltr. 1913
- Bulbophyllum ecornutoides Cootes & W.Suarez (2006)
- Bulbophyllum ecornutum (J.J.Sm.) J.J.Sm. 1914
  - Bulbophyllum ecornutum subsp. ecornutum
  - Bulbophyllum ecornutum subsp. verrucatum J.J.Verm., P.O'Byrne & A.L.Lamb (2015)
- Bulbophyllum ecristatum J.J.Verm. & P.O'Byrne (2008)
- Bulbophyllum edentatum H.Perrier 1937
- Bulbophyllum efferatum J.J.Verm. & P.O'Byrne (2011)
- Bulbophyllum elachanthe J.J.Verm. 1991
- Bulbophyllum elaphoglossum Schltr. 1911
- Bulbophyllum elasmatopus Schltr. in K.M.Schumann & C.A.G.Lauterbach 1905
- Bulbophyllum elassoglossum Siegerist 1991
- Bulbophyllum elassonotum Summerh. 1935: minuscule nodes bulbophyllum
- Bulbophyllum elatum (Hook.f.) J.J.Sm. 1912
- Bulbophyllum elegans Gardner ex Thwaites 1861
- Bulbophyllum elegantius Schltr. 1913
- Bulbophyllum elegantulum (Rolfe) J.J.Sm. 1912
- Bulbophyllum eleiosurum J.J.Verm., P.O'Byrne & A.L.Lamb (2015)
- Bulbophyllum elephantinum J.J.Sm. 1913
- Bulbophyllum elevatopunctatum J.J.Sm. 1920: raised dot bulbophyllum
- Bulbophyllum elisae (F.Muell.) Benth. 1871 – pineapple orchid
- Bulbophyllum elliae Rchb.f. in W.G.Walpers 1861
- Bulbophyllum elliottii Rolfe 1891
- Bulbophyllum ellipticifolium J.J.Sm. 1935
- Bulbophyllum ellipticum Schltr. 1913
- Bulbophyllum elmeri Ames 1912
- Bulbophyllum elodeiflorum J.J.Sm. 1912
- Bulbophyllum elongatum (Blume) Hassk. 1844
- Bulbophyllum emarginatum (Finet) J.J.Sm. 1912
- Bulbophyllum emunitum J.J.Verm. & A.L.Lamb (2008)
- Bulbophyllum encephalodes Summerh. 1951
- Bulbophyllum endotrachys Schltr. 1913
- Bulbophyllum entobaptum J.J.Verm. & P.O'Byrne (2008)
- Bulbophyllum entomonopsis J.J.Verm. & P.O'Byrne 1993
- Bulbophyllum epapillosum Schltr. 1913
- Bulbophyllum epibulbon Schltr. 1913
- Bulbophyllum epicranthes Hook.f. 1890
  - Bulbophyllum epicranthes var. epicranthes
  - Bulbophyllum epicranthes var. sumatranum (J.J.Sm.) J.J.Verm. 1982
- Bulbophyllum epiphytum Barb.Rodr. 1877
- Bulbophyllum erectum Thouars 1822
- Bulbophyllum ericssonii Kraenzl. (1893)
- Bulbophyllum erinaceum Schltr. 1913
- Bulbophyllum erioides Schltr. in K.M.Schumann & C.A.G.Lauterbach 1905
- Bulbophyllum erosimarginatum Cootes, W.Suarez & Boos (2011)
- Bulbophyllum erosipetalum C.Schweinf. 1951
- Bulbophyllum erratum Ames 1922
- Bulbophyllum erythroglossum Bosser 2000
- Bulbophyllum erythrokyle J.J.Verm., Schuit. & de Vogel (2014)
- Bulbophyllum erythrosema J.J.Verm. (2008)
- Bulbophyllum erythrostachyum Rolfe 1903
- Bulbophyllum erythrostictum Ormerod (2005)
- Bulbophyllum escritorii Ames 1915
- Bulbophyllum eublepharum Rchb.f. in W.G.Walpers 1861
- Bulbophyllum eutoreton J.J.Verm. (2008)
- Bulbophyllum evansii M.R.Hend. 1927: Evans' Bulbophyllum
- Bulbophyllum evasum T.E.Hunt & Rupp 1950 – creeping brittle orchid
- Bulbophyllum evrardii Gagnep. 1930: Evrard's Bulbophyllum
- Bulbophyllum exaltatum Lindl. 1842
- Bulbophyllum exasperatum Schltr. 1913
- Bulbophyllum exiguiflorum Schltr. 1913
- Bulbophyllum exiguum F.Muell. 1860 – tiny strand orchid
- Bulbophyllum exile Ames 1908
- Bulbophyllum exilipes Schltr. 1913
- Bulbophyllum expallidum J.J.Verm. 1984
- Bulbophyllum exquisitum Ames 1923

=== F ===
- Bulbophyllum facetum Garay, Hamer & Siegerist 1996
- Bulbophyllum falcatocaudatum J.J.Sm. 1914
- Bulbophyllum falcatum (Lindl.) Rchb.f. in W.G.Walpers 1861
  - Bulbophyllum falcatum var. bufo (Lindl.) Govaerts 1996
  - Bulbophyllum falcatum var. falcatum
  - Bulbophyllum falcatum var. velutinum (Lindl.) J.J.Verm. 1992
- Bulbophyllum falcibracteum Schltr. 1923
- Bulbophyllum falciferum J.J.Sm. 1910
- Bulbophyllum falcifolium Schltr. 1913
- Bulbophyllum falcipetalum Lindl. 1862
- Bulbophyllum falculicorne J.J.Sm. 1945
- Bulbophyllum fallacinum J.J.Verm. (2008)
- Bulbophyllum fallax Rolfe 1889
- Bulbophyllum farinulentum J.J.Sm. 1920
  - Bulbophyllum farinulentum subsp. densissimum (Carr) J.J.Verm. 2002
  - Bulbophyllum farinulentum subsp. farinulentum
- Bulbophyllum farreri (W.W.Sm.) Seidenf. (1973 publ. 1974).
- Bulbophyllum fasciatum Schltr. 1912
- Bulbophyllum fasciculatum Schltr. 1913
- Bulbophyllum fasciculiferum Schltr. 1923
- Bulbophyllum fascinator (Rolfe) Rolfe 1908
- Bulbophyllum fayi J.J.Verm. 1992
- Bulbophyllum fendlerianum E.C.Smidt & P.J.Cribb (2008)
- Bulbophyllum fenestratum J.J.Sm. (1907)
- Bulbophyllum fengianum (Ormerod) J.J.Verm. (2014)
- Bulbophyllum fenixii Ames, Philipp. J. Sci., C 8: 430 (1913 publ. 1914).
- Bulbophyllum ferkoanum Schltr. 1918
- Bulbophyllum fibratum (Gagnep.) T.B.Nguyen & D.H.Duong in T.B.Nguyen (ed.) 1984
- Bulbophyllum fibrinum J.J.Sm. 1913
- Bulbophyllum fibristectum J.J.Verm. (2008)
- Bulbophyllum filamentosum Schltr. 1913
- Bulbophyllum filicaule J.J.Sm. 1913
- Bulbophyllum filifolium Borba & E.C.Smidt 2004
- Bulbophyllum filovagans Carr 1933
- Bulbophyllum fimbriatum (Lindl.) Rchb.f. in W.G.Walpers 1861
- Bulbophyllum fimbriperianthium W.M.Lin, Kuo Huang & T.P.Lin (2006)
- Bulbophyllum finisterrae Schltr. 1913
- Bulbophyllum fionae J.J.Verm. & P.O'Byrne (2008)
- Bulbophyllum fischeri Seidenf. (1973 publ. 1974): Fischer's Bulbophyllum
- Bulbophyllum fissibrachium J.J.Sm. 1927
- Bulbophyllum fissipetalum Schltr. 1913
- Bulbophyllum flabellum-veneris (J.König) Aver. 2003
- Bulbophyllum flagellare Schltr. 1913
- Bulbophyllum flammuliferum Ridl. 1898: Flame-carrying Bulbophyllum
- Bulbophyllum flavescens (Blume) Lindl. 1830
- Bulbophyllum flavicolor J.J.Sm. 1929
- Bulbophyllum flavidiflorum Carr 1933
- Bulbophyllum flaviflorum (Tang, S.Liu & H.Y.Su) Seidenf. (1972 publ. 1973).
- Bulbophyllum flavofimbriatum J.J.Sm. 1931
- Bulbophyllum flavum Schltr. 1913
- Bulbophyllum fletcherianum Rolfe 1911: Fletcher's Bulbophyllum, Spies' Bulbophyllum
- Bulbophyllum flexuosum Schltr. 1913
- Bulbophyllum floribundum J.J.Sm. 1912
- Bulbophyllum florulentum Schltr. 1924
- Bulbophyllum foetidilabrum Ormerod 2001
- Bulbophyllum foetidum Schltr. 1913
  - Bulbophyllum foetidum var. foetidum
  - Bulbophyllum foetidum var. grandiflorum J.J.Sm. 1929
- Bulbophyllum folliculiferum J.J.Sm. 1914
- Bulbophyllum fonsflorum J.J.Verm. 1990
- Bulbophyllum foraminiferum J.J.Verm. 1996
- Bulbophyllum fordii (Rolfe) J.J.Sm. 1912
- Bulbophyllum forrestii Seidenf. (1973 publ. 1974).
- Bulbophyllum forsythianum Kraenzl. 1899
- Bulbophyllum fossatum J.J.Verm. & P.O'Byrne (2011)
- Bulbophyllum fractiflexum J.J.Sm. 1908
  - Bulbophyllum fractiflexum subsp. fractiflexum
  - Bulbophyllum fractiflexum subsp. solomonense J.J.Verm. & B.A.Lewis 1991
- Bulbophyllum fragosum J.J.Verm. & A.L.Lamb (2013)
- Bulbophyllum francoisii H.Perrier 1937
  - Bulbophyllum francoisii var. andrangense (H.Perrier) Bosser 1965
  - Bulbophyllum francoisii var. francoisii
- Bulbophyllum fraternum J.J.Verm. & P.O'Byrne (2008)
- Bulbophyllum freyi V.P.Castro & Speckm. (2012)
- Bulbophyllum fritillariiflorum J.J.Sm. 1912: Fritillaria-like Bulbophyllum
- Bulbophyllum frostii Summerh. 1928
- Bulbophyllum frustrans J.J.Sm. 1911
- Bulbophyllum fruticicola Schltr. in K.M.Schumann & C.A.G.Lauterbach 1905
- Bulbophyllum fruticulum J.J.Verm. (2008)
- Bulbophyllum fukuyamae Tuyama 1941
- Bulbophyllum fulgens J.J.Verm. 1996
- Bulbophyllum fulvibulbum J.J.Verm. 1991
- Bulbophyllum funingense Z.H.Tsi & H.C.Chen 1981
- Bulbophyllum furcatum Aver. 2003
- Bulbophyllum furcillatum J.J.Verm. & P.O'Byrne 2003
- Bulbophyllum fuscatum Schltr. 1913
- Bulbophyllum fusciflorum Schltr. 1913
- Bulbophyllum fuscopurpureum Wight 1851
- Bulbophyllum fuscum Lindl. 1839
  - Bulbophyllum fuscum var. fuscum
  - Bulbophyllum fuscum var. melinostachyum (Schltr.) J.J.Verm. 1986
- Bulbophyllum futile J.J.Sm. 1908

=== G ===
- Bulbophyllum gadgarrense Rupp 1949 – tangled rope orchid
- Bulbophyllum gajoense J.J.Sm. 1943
- Bulbophyllum galactanthum Schltr. 1921
- Bulbophyllum galliaheneum P.Royen 1979
- Bulbophyllum gamandrum J.J.Verm. & P.O'Byrne (2008)
- Bulbophyllum gamblei (Hook.f.) Hook.f. 1890: Gamble's Bulbophyllum
- Bulbophyllum gautierense J.J.Sm. 1912
- Bulbophyllum gehrtii E.C.Smidt & Borba (2009)
- Bulbophyllum gemma-reginae J.J.Verm. 1996
- Bulbophyllum geniculiferum J.J.Sm. 1912
- Bulbophyllum geraense Rchb.f. in W.G.Walpers 1864
- Bulbophyllum gerlandianum Kraenzl. 1886
- Bulbophyllum gibbolabium Seidenf. 1979: Hump-lipped Bulbophyllum
- Bulbophyllum gibbosum (Blume) Lindl. 1830: Humped Bulbophyllum
- Bulbophyllum gilgianum Kraenzl. 1899
- Bulbophyllum gilvum J.J.Verm. & A.L.Lamb 1994
- Bulbophyllum gimagaanense Ames 1912
- Bulbophyllum giriwoense J.J.Sm. 1914
- Bulbophyllum gjellerupii J.J.Sm. 1929
- Bulbophyllum glabrichelia Aver. (2017)
- Bulbophyllum glabrum Schltr. 1913
- Bulbophyllum gladiatum Lindl. 1842
- Bulbophyllum glanduliferum Schltr. 1913
- Bulbophyllum glandulosum Ames 1923
- Bulbophyllum glaucifolium J.J.Verm. 1991
- Bulbophyllum glaucum Schltr. 1913
- Bulbophyllum glebodactylum (W.Suarez & Cootes) Sieder & Kiehn (2010 publ. 2011)
- Bulbophyllum glebulosum J.J.Verm. & Cootes (2008)
- Bulbophyllum globiceps Schltr. in K.M.Schumann & C.A.G.Lauterbach 1905
- Bulbophyllum globuliforme Nicholls 1938
- Bulbophyllum globulosum (Ridl.) Schuit. & de Vogel 2003
- Bulbophyllum globulus Hook.f. 1890
- Bulbophyllum glutinosum (Barb.Rodr.) Cogn. in C.F.P.von Martius 1902
- Bulbophyllum gnomoniferum Ames 1908
- Bulbophyllum gobiense Schltr. 1912
- Bulbophyllum gofferjei J.J.Verm. & A.L.Lamb (2013)
- Bulbophyllum goliathense J.J.Sm. 1911
- Bulbophyllum gomphreniflorum J.J.Sm. 1918
- Bulbophyllum gongshanense Z.H.Tsi 1981
- Bulbophyllum goniopterum J.J.Verm., P.O'Byrne & A.L.Lamb, (2015)
- Bulbophyllum gracile Thouars 1822
- Bulbophyllum gracilipes King & Pantl. 1896
- Bulbophyllum graciliscapum Schltr. in K.M.Schumann & C.A.G.Lauterbach 1905
- Bulbophyllum gracillimum (Rolfe) Rolfe 1907 – wispy umbrella orchid
- Bulbophyllum gramineum Ridl. 1916
- Bulbophyllum grammopoma J.J.Verm. 1991
- Bulbophyllum grandiflorum Blume 1849
- Bulbophyllum grandifolium Schltr. 1913
- Bulbophyllum grandilabre Carr 1932
- Bulbophyllum grandimesense B.Gray & D.L.Jones 1989 – pale rope orchid
- Bulbophyllum granulosum Barb.Rodr. 1877
- Bulbophyllum graveolens (F.M.Bailey) J.J.Sm. 1912
- Bulbophyllum gravidum Lindl. 1862
- Bulbophyllum griffithii (Lindl.) Rchb.f. in W.G.Walpers 1861: Griffith's Bulbophyllum
- Bulbophyllum groeneveldtii J.J.Sm. 1920
- Bulbophyllum grotianum J.J.Verm. 2002
- Bulbophyllum grudense J.J.Sm. 1905
- Bulbophyllum guamense Ames 1914
- Bulbophyllum × guartelae Mancinelli & E.C.Smidt (2012)
- Bulbophyllum gunnarii Aver. (2005)
- Bulbophyllum gusdorfii J.J.Sm. 1917
- Bulbophyllum guttatum Schltr. 1913
- Bulbophyllum guttifilum Seidenf. 1996
- Bulbophyllum guttulatoides Aver. (2005)
- Bulbophyllum guttulatum (Hook.f.) N.P.Balakr. 1970: Small-spotted Bulbophyllum
- Bulbophyllum gyaloglossum J.J.Verm. 1993
- Bulbophyllum gymnopus Hook.f. 1890
- Bulbophyllum gyrochilum Seidenf. 1979

=== H ===
- Bulbophyllum habbemense P.Royen 1979
- Bulbophyllum habrotinum J.J.Verm. & A.L.Lamb 1994
- Bulbophyllum haematostictum J.J.Verm. & A.L.Lamb (2008)
- Bulbophyllum hahlianum Schltr. in K.M.Schumann & C.A.G.Lauterbach 1905
- Bulbophyllum hainanense Z.H.Tsi 1981
- Bulbophyllum halconense Ames 1907
- Bulbophyllum hamadryas Schltr. 1913
- Bulbophyllum hamatipes J.J.Sm. 1918
- Bulbophyllum hamelinii W.Watson 1893
- Bulbophyllum hampeliae Cootes, R.Boos & Naive (2016)
- Bulbophyllum hampelianum J.M.H.Shaw (2017)
- Bulbophyllum haniffii Carr 1932
- Bulbophyllum hans-meyeri J.J.Wood 1981
- Bulbophyllum hapalanthos Garay 1999
- Bulbophyllum hassallii Kores 1989
- Bulbophyllum hastiferum Schltr. 1911
- Bulbophyllum hatschbachianum E.C.Smidt & Borba (2008)
- Bulbophyllum hatusimanum Tuyama 1940
- Bulbophyllum heldiorum J.J.Verm. 1991
- Bulbophyllum helenae (Kuntze) J.J.Sm. 1912
- Bulbophyllum hellwigianum Kraenzl. ex Warb. 1893
- Bulbophyllum hemiprionotum J.J.Verm. & A.L.Lamb 1994
- Bulbophyllum hemisterranthum J.J.Verm. & P.O'Byrne (2008)
- Bulbophyllum henanense J.L.Lu 1992
- Bulbophyllum hengstumianum J.J.Verm., de Vogel & A.Vogel (2010)
- Bulbophyllum henrici Schltr. 1924
- Bulbophyllum henrici var. henrici
- Bulbophyllum henrici var. rectangulare H.Perrier ex Hermans (2007)
- Bulbophyllum herbula Frapp. ex Cordem. 1895
- Bulbophyllum hermonii (P.J.Cribb & B.A.Lewis) J.J.Verm., Schuit. & de Vogel (2015)
- Bulbophyllum heteroblepharon Schltr. 1913
- Bulbophyllum heterorhopalon Schltr. 1913
- Bulbophyllum heterosepalum Schltr. 1913
- Bulbophyllum hexarhopalon Schltr. 1906
- Bulbophyllum hexurum Schltr. 1913
- Bulbophyllum hians Schltr. 1913
- Bulbophyllum hiepii Aver. 1992
- Bulbophyllum hildebrandtii Rchb.f. 1881
- Bulbophyllum hiljeae J.J.Verm. 1991
- Bulbophyllum himantosepalum J.J.Verm. & Sieder (2015)
- Bulbophyllum hirsutissimum Kraenzl. 1912
- Bulbophyllum hirsutiusculum H.Perrier 1937
- Bulbophyllum hirtulum Ridl. 1900
- Bulbophyllum hirtum (Sm.) Lindl. 1830
- Bulbophyllum hirudiniferum J.J.Verm. 1982
- Bulbophyllum hirundinis (Gagnep.) Seidenf. (1973 publ. 1974)
- Bulbophyllum histrionicum Rchb.f. ex G.A.Fisch. & P.J.Cribb (2009)
- Bulbophyllum hodgsonii M.R.Hend. 1927
- Bulbophyllum hoehnei E.C.Smidt & Borba (2007)
- Bulbophyllum hollandianum J.J.Sm. 1913
- Bulbophyllum holochilum J.J.Sm. 1912
- Bulbophyllum horizontale Bosser 1965
- Bulbophyllum horridulum J.J.Verm. 1986
- Bulbophyllum hortorum J.J.Verm., P.O'Byrne & A.L.Lamb (2015)
- Bulbophyllum hovarum Schltr. 1924
- Bulbophyllum howcroftii Garay, Hamer & Siegerist 1995
- Bulbophyllum hoyifolium J.J.Verm. 1993
- Bulbophyllum huangshanense Y.M.Hu & X.H.Jin (2015)
- Bulbophyllum humbertii Schltr. 1922
- Bulbophyllum humblotii Rolfe 1891
- Bulbophyllum humile Schltr. 1913
- Bulbophyllum hyalinum Schltr. 1924
- Bulbophyllum hyalosemoides J.J.Verm. & P.O'Byrne (2011)
- Bulbophyllum hydrophilum J.J.Sm. 1905
- Bulbophyllum hymenanthum Hook.f. 1890
- Bulbophyllum hymenochilum Kraenzl. 1904
- Bulbophyllum hyposiphon J.J.Verm. & A.L.Lamb (2013)
- Bulbophyllum hyption J.J.Verm., P.O'Byrne & A.L.Lamb (2015)
- Bulbophyllum hystricinum Schltr. 1913

=== I ===
- Bulbophyllum ialibuense Ormerod 2002
- Bulbophyllum ichthyosme J.J.Verm. (2008)
- Bulbophyllum icteranthum Schltr. 1913
- Bulbophyllum idenburgense J.J.Sm. 1929
- Bulbophyllum igneum J.J.Sm. 1913
- Bulbophyllum ignevenosum Carr 1930
- Bulbophyllum ignobile J.J.Sm. 1934
- Bulbophyllum ikongoense H.Perrier 1937
- Bulbophyllum illecebrum J.J.Verm. & P.O'Byrne 2003
- Bulbophyllum imbricans J.J.Sm. 1912

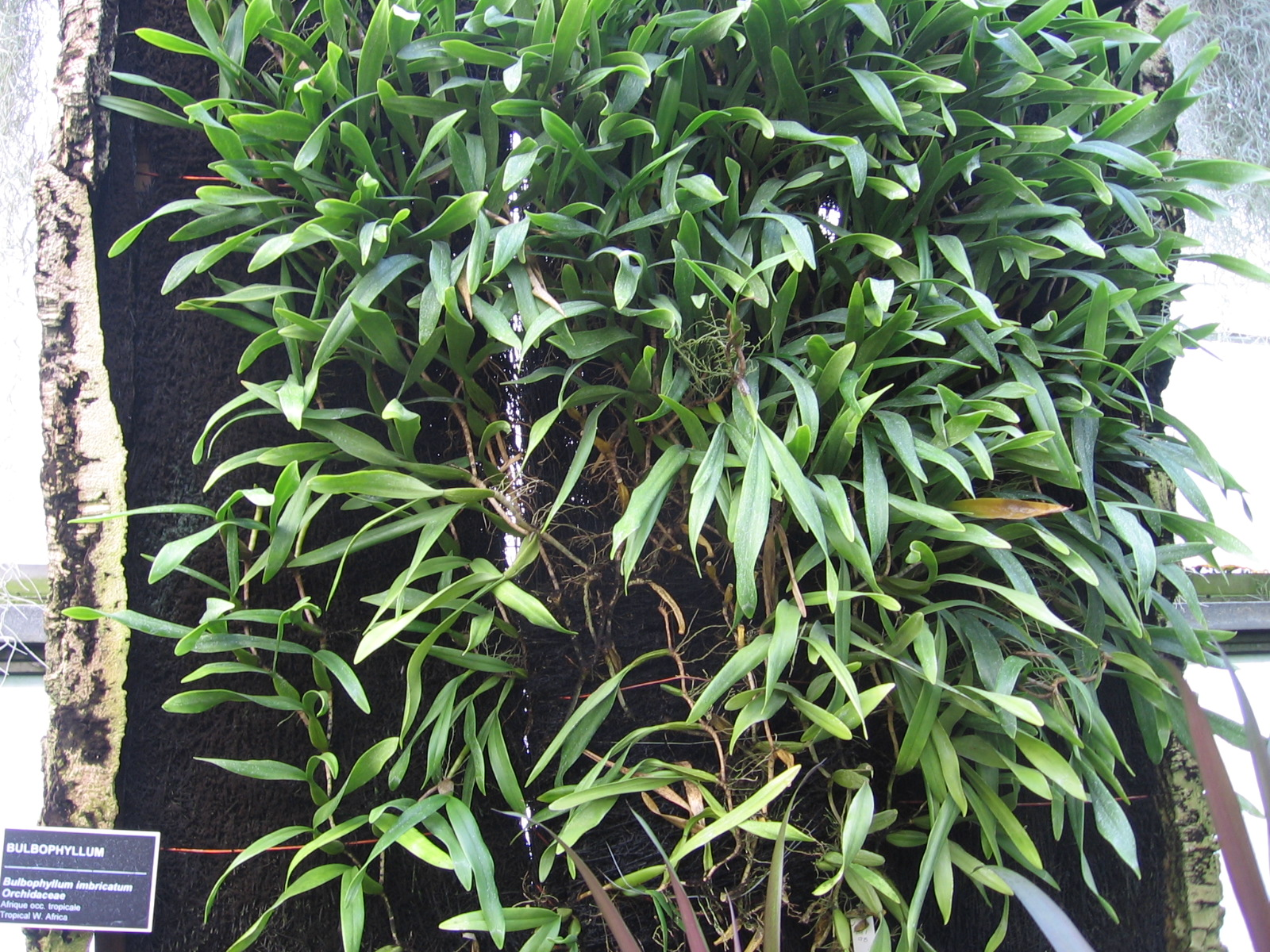

- Bulbophyllum imbricatum Lindl. 1841
- Bulbophyllum imerinense Schltr. 1925
- Bulbophyllum imitator J.J.Verm. 1992
- Bulbophyllum impar Ridl. 1917
- Bulbophyllum inacootesiae Cootes, M.Leon & Naive (2016)
- Bulbophyllum inaequale (Blume) Lindl. 1830
- Bulbophyllum inaequisepalum Schltr. 1923
- Bulbophyllum inauditum Schltr. 1913
- Bulbophyllum incarum Kraenzl. 1905: Incan Bulbophyllum
- Bulbophyllum inciferum J.J.Verm. 1993
- Bulbophyllum incisilabrum J.J.Verm. & P.O'Byrne 2003
- Bulbophyllum inclinatum J.J.Sm. 1935
- Bulbophyllum incommodum Kores 1989
- Bulbophyllum inconspicuum Maxim. 1887
- Bulbophyllum incumbens Schltr. 1913
- Bulbophyllum incurvum Thouars 1822
- Bulbophyllum indragiriense Schltr. (1906)
- Bulbophyllum iners Rchb.f. 1880
- Bulbophyllum infundibuliforme J.J.Sm. 1900
  - Bulbophyllum infundibuliforme subsp. hymenobracteatum (Schltr.) De Witte & J.J.Verm. (2010)
  - Bulbophyllum infundibuliforme subsp. infundibuliforme
- Bulbophyllum inhaiense V.P.Castro & K.G.Lacerda (2009)
- Bulbophyllum injoloense De Wild. 1916
  - Bulbophyllum injoloense subsp. injoloense
  - Bulbophyllum injoloense subsp. pseudoxypterum (J.J.Verm.) J.J.Verm. 1986
- Bulbophyllum inops Rchb.f. 1880
- Bulbophyllum inornatum J.J.Verm. 1987
- Bulbophyllum inquirendum J.J.Verm. 1993
- Bulbophyllum insectiferum Barb.Rodr. 1882
- Bulbophyllum insipidum J.J.Verm. & P.O'Byrne (2008)
- Bulbophyllum insolitum Bosser 1971
- Bulbophyllum insulsoides Seidenf. 1974)
- Bulbophyllum intermedium F.M.Bailey 1901
- Bulbophyllum interpositum J.J.Verm., Schuit. & de Vogel (2015)
- Bulbophyllum intertextum Lindl. 1862
- Bulbophyllum intonsum J.J.Verm. (2008)
- Bulbophyllum intricatum Seidenf. 1979: Intricate Bulbophyllum
- Bulbophyllum inversum Schltr. 1913
- Bulbophyllum invisum Ames 1922
- Bulbophyllum involutum Borba. Semir & F.Barros 1998
- Bulbophyllum ionophyllum J.J.Verm. 1991
- Bulbophyllum ipanemense Hoehne 1938: Ipanema Bulbophyllum
- Bulbophyllum ischnobasis J.J.Verm., P.O'Byrne & A.L.Lamb (2015)
- Bulbophyllum ischnopus Schltr. in K.M.Schumann & C.A.G.Lauterbach 1905
- Bulbophyllum iterans J.J.Verm. & P.O'Byrne 2003
- Bulbophyllum ivorense P.J.Cribb & Perez-Vera 1975

=== J ===
- Bulbophyllum jaapii Szlach. & Olszewski 2001
- Bulbophyllum jackyi G.A.Fisch., Sieder & P.J.Cribb (2007)
- Bulbophyllum jainii (Hynn. & Malhotra) J.J.Verm., Schuit. & de Vogel (2014)
- Bulbophyllum jamaicense Cogn. 1909
- Bulbophyllum janus J.J.Verm. 2002
- Bulbophyllum japonicum (Makino) Makino 1910
- Bulbophyllum jayi J.J.Verm. & A.L.Lamb (2013)
- Bulbophyllum jiewhoei J.J.Verm. & P.O'Byrne 2000
- Bulbophyllum johannis H.Wendl. & Kraenzl. 1894
- Bulbophyllum johannulii J.J.Verm. 1982
- Bulbophyllum johnsonii T.E.Hunt 1950 – yellow snake orchid
- Bulbophyllum jolandae J.J.Verm. 1991
- Bulbophyllum jonpetri J.J.Verm. & A.L.Lamb (2013)
- Bulbophyllum josephi (Kuntze) Summerh. 1945
  - Bulbophyllum josephi var. josephi
  - Bulbophyllum josephi var. mahonii (Rolfe) J.J.Verm. 1986
- Bulbophyllum josii J.J.Verm. & P.O'Byrne (2011)
- Bulbophyllum jumelleanum Schltr. 1913

=== K ===
- Bulbophyllum kachinense (Seidenf.) J.J.Verm., Schuit. & de Vogel (2014)
- Bulbophyllum kainochiloides H.Perrier 1937
- Bulbophyllum kaitiense Rchb.f. in W.G.Walpers 1861
- Bulbophyllum kanburiense Seidenf. 1970
- Bulbophyllum kaniense Schltr. 1913
- Bulbophyllum kapitense J.J.Verm., P.O'Byrne & A.L.Lamb (2015)
- Bulbophyllum karenkoensis T.P.Lin, Taiwania (2016)
  - Bulbophyllum karenkoensis var. karenkoensis
  - Bulbophyllum karenkoensis var. puniceum (T.P.Lin & Y.N.Chang) T.P.Lin (2016)
- Bulbophyllum kauloense Schltr. 1913
- Bulbophyllum kautskyi Toscano 2000
- Bulbophyllum keekee N.Hall 1977
- Bulbophyllum kegelii Hamer & Garay (1995 publ. 1997).
- Bulbophyllum kelelense Schltr. 1913
- Bulbophyllum kempfii Schltr. 1921
- Bulbophyllum kemulense J.J.Sm. 1931
- Bulbophyllum kenae J.J.Verm. 1993
- Bulbophyllum kenchungianum P.O'Byrne & Gokusing (2016)
- Bulbophyllum kenejianum Schltr. (1913)
- Bulbophyllum keralense M.Kumar & Sequiera 2001
- Bulbophyllum kermesinostriatum (J.J.Sm.) J.J.Verm., Schuit. & de Vogel (2014)
- Bulbophyllum kermesinum Ridl. 1889
- Bulbophyllum kestron J.J.Verm. & A.L.Lamb 1988
- Bulbophyllum khaoyaiense Seidenf. 1970
- Bulbophyllum khasyanum Griff. 1851
- Bulbophyllum kiamfeeanum J.J.Verm. & P.O'Byrne (2008)
- Bulbophyllum kieneri Bosser 1971
- Bulbophyllum kingii Hook.f. (1890)
- Bulbophyllum kipgenii (Kishor, Chowlu & Vij) J.J.Verm., Schuit. & de Vogel 104 (2014)
- Bulbophyllum kirroanthum Schltr. 1911
- Bulbophyllum kittredgei (Garay, Hamer & Siegerist) J.J.Verm. (1996)
- Bulbophyllum kivuense J.J.Verm. 1986
- Bulbophyllum kjellbergii J.J.Sm. 1933
- Bulbophyllum klabatense Schltr. 1911
  - Bulbophyllum klabatense subsp. klabatense
  - Bulbophyllum klabatense subsp. sulawesii (Garay, Hamer & Siegerist) J.J.Verm. & P.O'Byrne (2011)
- Bulbophyllum koilobasis J.J.Verm., P.O'Byrne & A.L.Lamb (2015)
- Bulbophyllum kontumense Gagnep. 1950
- Bulbophyllum korimense J.J.Sm. 1929
- Bulbophyllum korinchense Ridl. 1917
- Bulbophyllum korthalsii Schltr. 1907
- Bulbophyllum kuanwuense S.W.Chung & T.C.Hsu (2006)
- Bulbophyllum kubahense J.J.Verm. & A.L.Lamb (2011)
- Bulbophyllum kupense P.J.Cribb & B.J.Pollard 2004
- Bulbophyllum kusaiense Tuyama 1940
- Bulbophyllum kwangtungense Schltr. 1924

=== L ===
- Bulbophyllum labatii Bosser 2004
- Bulbophyllum laciniatum (Barb.Rodr.) Cogn. in C.F.P.von Martius 1902: Small-tipped Bulbophyllum
- Bulbophyllum lacinulosum J.J.Sm. 1927
- Bulbophyllum laetum J.J.Verm. 1996
- Bulbophyllum lagaroglossum J.J.Verm. (2008)
- Bulbophyllum lagaropetalum J.J.Verm., Schuit. & de Vogel (2014)
- Bulbophyllum lagarophyllum J.J.Verm., Schuit. & de Vogel (2014)
- Bulbophyllum lageniforme F.M.Bailey 1904
- Bulbophyllum lakatoense Bosser 1969
- Bulbophyllum lambii J.J.Verm. 1991
- Bulbophyllum lamelluliferum J.J.Sm. 1913
- Bulbophyllum lamii J.J.Sm. 1929
- Bulbophyllum lamingtonense D.L.Jones 1993 – cream rope orchid
- Bulbophyllum lancifolium Ames 1912
- Bulbophyllum lancilabium Ames 1915
- Bulbophyllum lancipetalum Ames 1912
- Bulbophyllum lancisepalum H.Perrier 1938
- Bulbophyllum languidum J.J.Sm. 1922
- Bulbophyllum lanuginosum J.J.Verm. 2002
- Bulbophyllum laoticum Gagnep. 1930: Laotian Bulbophyllum
- Bulbophyllum lasianthum Lindl. 1855
- Bulbophyllum lasiochilum C.S.P.Parish & Rchb.f. 1874
- Bulbophyllum lasiogaster J.J.Verm. & P.O'Byrne (2011)
- Bulbophyllum lasioglossum Rolfe ex Ames 1905
- Bulbophyllum lasiopetalum Kraenzl. 1916
- Bulbophyllum latibrachiatum J.J.Sm. 1908
  - Bulbophyllum latibrachiatum var. epilosum J.J.Sm. 1913
  - Bulbophyllum latibrachiatum var. latibrachiatum
- Bulbophyllum latipes J.J.Sm. 1935
- Bulbophyllum latipetalum H.Perrier 1951
- Bulbophyllum latisepalum Ames & C.Schweinf. in O.Ames 1920
- Bulbophyllum laxiflorum (Blume) Lindl. 1830
- Bulbophyllum laxum Schltr. in K.M.Schumann & C.A.G.Lauterbach 1905
- Bulbophyllum leandrianum H.Perrier 1937
- Bulbophyllum lecouflei Bosser 1989
- Bulbophyllum ledungense Tang & F.T.Wang 1974
- Bulbophyllum lehmannianum Kraenzl. 1899
- Bulbophyllum leibergii Ames & Rolfe in O.Ames 1915
- Bulbophyllum leion J.J.Verm., Schuit. & de Vogel (2014)
- Bulbophyllum lemnifolium Schltr. 1913
- Bulbophyllum lemniscatoides Rolfe 1890: lemniscatum-like bulbophyllum
  - Bulbophyllum lemniscatoides var. exappendiculatum 1920
  - Bulbophyllum lemniscatoides var. lemniscatoides
- Bulbophyllum lemniscatum C.S.P.Parish ex Hook.f. 1872
- Bulbophyllum lemuraeoides H.Perrier (1937)
- Bulbophyllum lemurense Bosser & P.J.Cribb in D.J.Du Puy & al. 1999
- Bulbophyllum leniae J.J.Verm. 1991
- Bulbophyllum leonii Kraenzl. 1899
- Bulbophyllum leontoglossum Schltr. 1913
- Bulbophyllum leopardinum (Wall.) Lindl. in N.Wallich 1829: leopard-spotted bulbophyllum
- Bulbophyllum lepantense Ames 1912
- Bulbophyllum lepanthiflorum Schltr. 1913
- Bulbophyllum lepidum (Blume) J.J.Sm. (1905)
- Bulbophyllum leproglossum J.J.Verm. & A.L.Lamb 1988
- Bulbophyllum leptanthum Hook.f. 1890
- Bulbophyllum leptobulbon J.J.Verm. 1996
- Bulbophyllum leptocaulon Kraenzl. 1916
- Bulbophyllum leptochlamys Schltr. 1924
- Bulbophyllum leptoflorum P.O'Byrne & P.T.Ong (2014)
- Bulbophyllum leptoglossum J.J.Verm. & A.L.Lamb (2008)
- Bulbophyllum leptoleucum Schltr. 1913
- Bulbophyllum leptophyllum W.Kittr. (1984 publ. 1985).
- Bulbophyllum leptopus Schltr. in K.M.Schumann & C.A.G.Lauterbach 1905
- Bulbophyllum leptosepalum Hook.f. 1890
- Bulbophyllum leptostachyum Schltr. 1922
- Bulbophyllum leptotriche J.J.Verm., Schuit. & de Vogel (2014)
- Bulbophyllum leucoglossum Schuit., Juswara & Droissart (2016)
- Bulbophyllum leucorhachis (Rolfe) Schltr. (1905)
- Bulbophyllum leucorhodum Schltr. 1913
- Bulbophyllum leucothyrsus Schltr. 1913: white-flowered bunch bulbophyllum
- Bulbophyllum levanae Ames 1915: Levan's bulbophyllum
  - Bulbophyllum levanae var. giganteum Quisumb. & C.Schweinf. 1953
- Bulbophyllum levatii Kraenzl. 1929
  - Bulbophyllum levatii subsp. levatii
  - Bulbophyllum levatii subsp. mischanthum J.J.Verm. 1993
- Bulbophyllum leve Schltr. 1913
- Bulbophyllum levidense J.J.Sm. 1929
- Bulbophyllum levyae Garay, Hamer & Siegerist 1995:
- Bulbophyllum lewisense B.Gray & D.L.Jones 1989 – Mount Lewis rope orchid
- Bulbophyllum leysianum Burb. (1895)
- Bulbophyllum leytense Ames 1915
- Bulbophyllum lichenoides Schltr. 1913
- Bulbophyllum lichenophylax Schltr. 1924
- Bulbophyllum ligulatum W.Kittr. (1984 publ. 1985).
- Bulbophyllum ligulifolium J.J.Sm. 1934
- Bulbophyllum lilacinum Ridl. 1897:
- Bulbophyllum lilianae Rendle 1917 – warty strand orchid
- Bulbophyllum limbatum Lindl. 1840
- Bulbophyllum lindleyanum Griff. 1851:
- Bulbophyllum lineare Frapp. ex Cordem. 1895
- Bulbophyllum lineariflorum J.J.Sm. 1911
- Bulbophyllum linearifolium King & Pantl. 1897
- Bulbophyllum linearilabium J.J.Sm. 1912
- Bulbophyllum lineariligulatum Schltr. 1924
- Bulbophyllum lineatum (Teijsm. & Binn.) J.J.Sm. 1912
- Bulbophyllum lineolatum Schltr. 1913
- Bulbophyllum linggense J.J.Sm. 1922
- Bulbophyllum lingulatum Rendle 1921
  - Bulbophyllum lingulatum f. lingulatum
  - Bulbophyllum lingulatum f. microphyton (Guillaumin) N.Hall 1977
- Bulbophyllum liparidioides Schltr. 1924
- Bulbophyllum lipense Ames 1923
- Bulbophyllum lissoglossum J.J.Verm. 1991: smooth-lipped bulbophyllum
- Bulbophyllum lizae J.J.Verm. 1984
- Bulbophyllum lobbii Lindl. 1847: Lobb's Bulbophyllum, Thailand Bulbophyllum, Sumatran Bulbophyllum

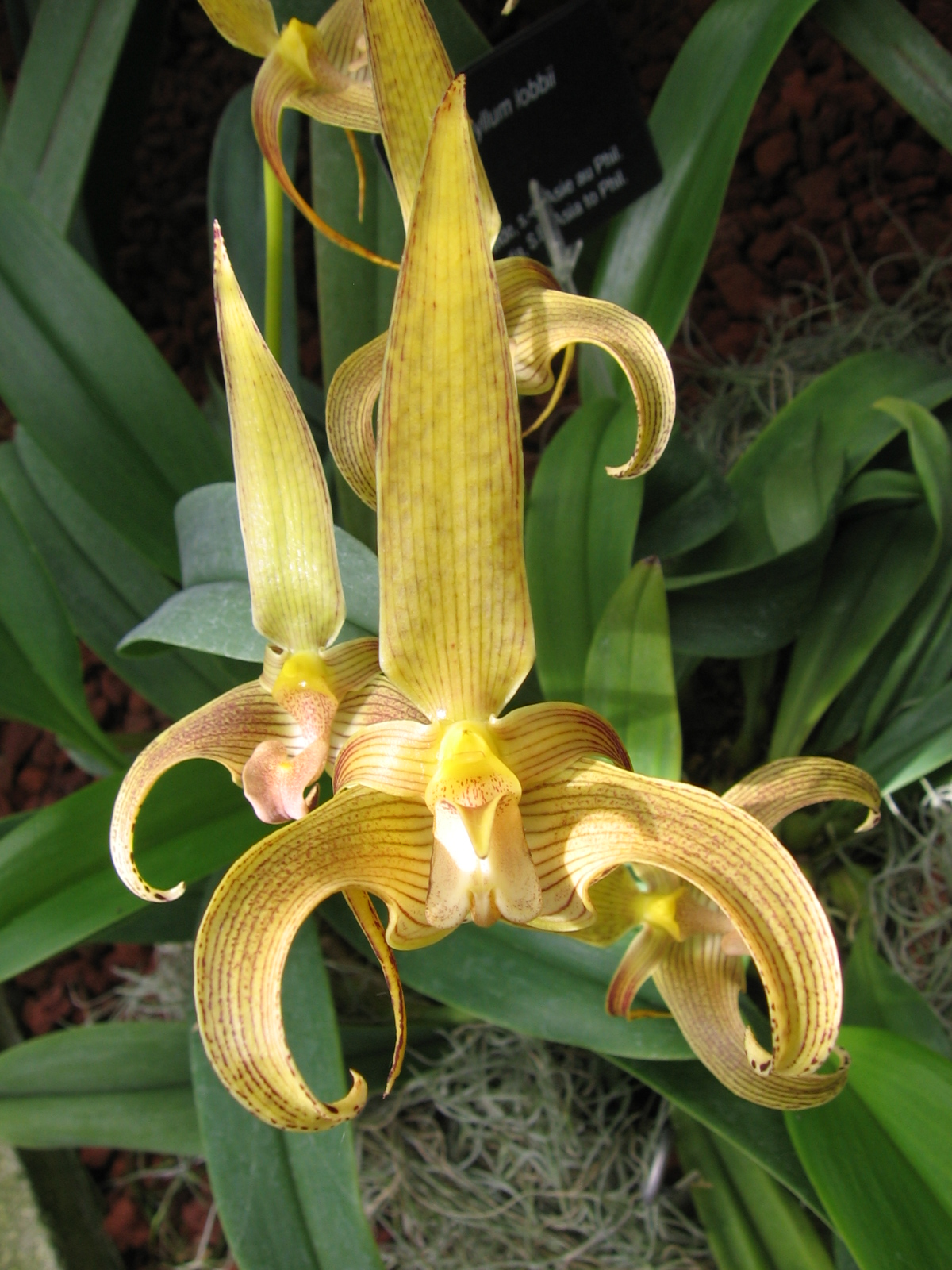
Bulbophyllum lobbi

  - Bulbophyllum lobbii subsp. boreoborneense Mangal, F.Velazquez & J.J.Verm. (2015)
  - Bulbophyllum lobbii subsp. breviflorum (J.J.Sm.) Mangal, F.Velazquez & J.J.Verm. (2015)
  - Bulbophyllum lobbii subsp. lobbii
  - Bulbophyllum lobbii subsp. siamense (Rchb.f.) Mangal, F.Velazquez & J.J.Verm. (2015)
- Bulbophyllum loherianum (Kraenzl.) Ames in E.D.Merrill 1925
- Bulbophyllum lohokii J.J.Verm. & A.L.Lamb 1994
- Bulbophyllum lokonense Schltr. 1911
- Bulbophyllum lombokense Rysy (2014)
- Bulbophyllum lomsakense J.J.Verm., Schuit. & de Vogel (2014)
- Bulbophyllum lonchophyllum Schltr. 1913
- Bulbophyllum longebracteatum Seidenf. (1979)
- Bulbophyllum longerepens Ridl. (1908)
- Bulbophyllum longhutense J.J.Sm. 1931
- Bulbophyllum longibrachiatum Z.H.Tsi 1981
- Bulbophyllum longibracteatum Seidenf. 1979
- Bulbophyllum longiflorum Thouars 1822 – pale umbrella orchid
- Bulbophyllum longilabre Schltr. 1912
- Bulbophyllum longimucronatum Ames & C.Schweinf. in O.Ames 1920
- Bulbophyllum longipedicellatum J.J.Sm. 1910
  - Bulbophyllum longipedicellatum var. gjellerupii J.J.Sm. 1911
  - Bulbophyllum longipedicellatum var. longipedicellatum
- Bulbophyllum longipes Rchb.f. in W.G.Walpers (1861)
- Bulbophyllum longipetalum Pabst 1964
- Bulbophyllum longipetiolatum Ames 1912
- Bulbophyllum longirostre Schltr. 1913
- Bulbophyllum longiscapum Rolfe 1896
- Bulbophyllum longisepalum Rolfe 1895
- Bulbophyllum longissimum (Ridl.) J.J.Sm. 1912
- Bulbophyllum longistelidium Ridl. (1924)
- Bulbophyllum longivagans Carr 1933
- Bulbophyllum longivaginans H.Perrier 1937
- Bulbophyllum lopalanthum J.J.Verm., Schuit. & de Vogel (2014)
- Bulbophyllum lophoglottis (Guillaumin) N.Hall 1977
- Bulbophyllum lophoton J.J.Verm. 1993
- Bulbophyllum lordoglossum J.J.Verm. & A.L.Lamb 1994
- Bulbophyllum lorentzianum J.J.Sm. 1910
- Bulbophyllum louisiadum Schltr. 1919
- Bulbophyllum loxophyllum Schltr. 1913
- Bulbophyllum luanii Tixier 1965
- Bulbophyllum lucidum Schltr. 1924
- Bulbophyllum luciphilum Stvart 2000
- Bulbophyllum luckraftii F.Muell. 1882
- Bulbophyllum lumbriciforme J.J.Sm. 1920
- Bulbophyllum lupulinum Lindl. 1862
- Bulbophyllum luteobracteatum Jum. & H.Perrier 1912
- Bulbophyllum luteopurpureum J.J.Sm. 1907
- Bulbophyllum luteum J.J.Verm (2008)
- Bulbophyllum lyciachungianum P.O'Byrne & Gokusing (2016)
- Bulbophyllum lygeron J.J.Verm. 1991
- Bulbophyllum lyperocephalum Schltr. 1924
- Bulbophyllum lyperostachyum Schltr. 1924
- Bulbophyllum lyriforme J.J.Verm. & P.O'Byrne 2003

=== M ===
- Bulbophyllum maanshanense Z.J.Liu, L.J.Chen & W.H.Rao (2010)
- Bulbophyllum maboroense Schltr. 1913
- Bulbophyllum machupicchuense D.E.Benn. & Christenson 2001
- Bulbophyllum macilentum J.J.Verm. 1993
- Bulbophyllum macneiceae Schuit. & de Vogel (2005)
- Bulbophyllum macphersonii Rupp 1934 – small eyelash orchid
  - Bulbophyllum macphersonii var. macphersonii
  - Bulbophyllum macphersonii var. spathulatum Dockrill & St.Cloud 1957
- Bulbophyllum macraei (Lindl.) Rchb.f. in W.G.Walpers 1861
- Bulbophyllum macranthoides Kraenzl. 1905: Macrantha-like Bulbophyllum
- Bulbophyllum macranthum Lindl. 1844
- Bulbophyllum macrobulbum J.J.Sm. 1910
- Bulbophyllum macrocarpum Frapp. ex Cordem. 1895
- Bulbophyllum macroceras Barb.Rodr. 1882
- Bulbophyllum macrochilum Rolfe 1896
- Bulbophyllum macrocoleum Seidenf. 1979
- Bulbophyllum macrorhopalon Schltr. 1913
- Bulbophyllum macrorrhinum (P.Royen) J.J.Verm. (2014)
- Bulbophyllum macrourum Schltr. in K.M.Schumann & C.A.G.Lauterbach 1905
- Bulbophyllum maculatum Boxall ex Náves in F.M.Blanco 1880
- Bulbophyllum maculiflorum J.J.Verm., Schuit. & de Vogel (2015)
- Bulbophyllum magnibracteatum Summerh. 1935
- Bulbophyllum magnum J.J.Verm. (2013)
- Bulbophyllum magnussonianum J.J.Verm., de Vogel & A.Vogel (2010)
- Bulbophyllum mahakamense J.J.Sm. 1909
- Bulbophyllum maijenense Schltr. 1913
- Bulbophyllum majus (Ridl.) P.Royen 1979
- Bulbophyllum makoyanum (Rchb.f.) Ridl. 1907
- Bulbophyllum malachadenia Cogn. in C.F.P.von Martius 1902
- Bulbophyllum maleolens Kraenzl. 1928
- Bulbophyllum malleolabrum Carr 1932
- Bulbophyllum mamberamense J.J.Sm. 1915
- Bulbophyllum manabendrae D.K.Roy, Barbhuiya & Talukdar (2014)
- Bulbophyllum mananjarense Poiss. 1912
- Bulbophyllum manarae Foldats 1968
- Bulbophyllum mandibulare Rchb.f. 1882: Chin-like Bulbophyllum
- Bulbophyllum mangenotii Bosser 1965
- Bulbophyllum manipurense C.S.Kumar & P.C.S.Kumar (2005)
- Bulbophyllum manobulbum Schltr. in K.M.Schumann & C.A.G.Lauterbach 1905
- Bulbophyllum maquilingense Ames & Quisumb. 1932: Mount Makiling Bulbophyllum
- Bulbophyllum marginatum Schltr. 1913
- Bulbophyllum marivelense Ames 1912
- Bulbophyllum marknaivei Cootes, R.Boos & M.Leon (2016)
- Bulbophyllum marojejiense H.Perrier 1951
- Bulbophyllum marovoense H.Perrier 1951
- Bulbophyllum marudiense Carr 1935
- Bulbophyllum masaganapense Ames 1920
- Bulbophyllum masarangicum Schltr. 1911
- Bulbophyllum maskeliyense Livera 1926
- Bulbophyllum masoalanum Schltr. 1916: Masoala Bulbophyllum
- Bulbophyllum masonii (Senghas) J.J.Wood 1986
- Bulbophyllum mastersianum (Rolfe) J.J.Sm. 1912
- Bulbophyllum mattesii Sieder & Kiehn (2009)
- Bulbophyllum maudeae A.D.Hawkes 1966
- Bulbophyllum maxillare (Lindl.) Rchb.f. (1861) – red horntail orchid
- Bulbophyllum maxillarioides Schltr. in K.M.Schumann & C.A.G.Lauterbach 1905
- Bulbophyllum maximum (Lindl.) Rchb.f. in W.G.Walpers 1861
- Bulbophyllum mayrii J.J.Sm. 1934
- Bulbophyllum mearnsii Ames (1913 publ. 1914): Mearns' Bulbophyllum
- Bulbophyllum mediocre Summerh. ex Exell 1959
- Bulbophyllum medioximum J.J.Verm., Schuit. & de Vogel (2014)
- Bulbophyllum medusae (Lindl.) Rchb.f. in W.G.Walpers 1861
- Bulbophyllum megalonyx Rchb.f. 1881
- Bulbophyllum melanoglossum Hayata 1914
- Bulbophyllum melilotus J.J.Sm. 1929
- Bulbophyllum melinanthum Schltr. in K.M.Schumann & C.A.G.Lauterbach 1905
- Bulbophyllum melinoglossum Schltr. 1913
- Bulbophyllum melleum H.Perrier 1937
- Bulbophyllum melloi Pabst 1977
- Bulbophyllum membranaceum Teijsm. & Binn. 1855
- Bulbophyllum membranifolium Hook.f. 1890
  - Bulbophyllum membranifolium subsp. inunctum (J.J.Sm.) J.J.Verm., P.O'Byrne & A.L.Lamb (2015)
  - Bulbophyllum membranifolium subsp. membranifolium
- Bulbophyllum menghaiense Z.H.Tsi 1981
- Bulbophyllum menglaense Jian W.Li & X.H.Jin (2017)
- Bulbophyllum menglunense Z.H.Tsi & Y.Z.Ma 1985
- Bulbophyllum mengyuanense Q.Liu, Jian W.Li & X.H.Jin (2015)
- Bulbophyllum mentiferum J.J.Sm. 1927
- Bulbophyllum mentosum Barb.Rodr. 1877
- Bulbophyllum meridense Rchb.f. 1850
- Bulbophyllum meristorhachis Garay & Dunst. 1976
- Bulbophyllum merrittii Ames 1907
- Bulbophyllum mesodon J.J.Verm. 1993
- Bulbophyllum meson J.J.Verm., Schuit. & de Vogel (2014)
- Bulbophyllum metonymon Summerh. (1951 publ. 1952).
- Bulbophyllum micholitzianum Kraenzl. 1893
- Bulbophyllum micholitzii Rolfe 1901: Micholitz' Bulbophyllum
- Bulbophyllum micranthum Barb.Rodr. 1877
- Bulbophyllum microblepharon Schltr. 1913
- Bulbophyllum microbulbon Schltr. in K.M.Schumann & C.A.G.Lauterbach 1905
- Bulbophyllum microcala P.F.Hunt 1970
- Bulbophyllum microdendron Schltr. 1913
- Bulbophyllum microglossum Ridl. 1908: Small-lipped Bulbophyllum
- Bulbophyllum microlabium W.Kittr. (1984 publ. 1985).
- Bulbophyllum micronesiacum Schltr. 1921
- Bulbophyllum micropetaliforme Leite 1946
- Bulbophyllum micropetalum Lindl. (1862)
- Bulbophyllum microrhombos Schltr. 1912
- Bulbophyllum microsphaerum Schltr. 1913
- Bulbophyllum microtepalum Rchb.f. in W.G.Walpers 1861:
- Bulbophyllum microtes Schltr. 1913
- Bulbophyllum microthamnus Schltr. 1923
- Bulbophyllum migueldavidii Cootes, Cabactulan & Pimentel (2017)
- Bulbophyllum mimiense Schltr. 1913
- Bulbophyllum minax Schltr. 1924
- Bulbophyllum mindorense Ames 1907
- Bulbophyllum minutibulbum W.Kittr. (1984 publ. 1985).
- Bulbophyllum minutilabrum H.Perrier 1937
- Bulbophyllum minutipetalum Schltr. 1913: Small-petaled Bulbophyllum
- Bulbophyllum minutissimum (F.Muell.) F.Muell. 1878
- Bulbophyllum minutius J.J.Verm., Schuit. & de Vogel (2014)
- Bulbophyllum minutulum Ridl. ex Burkill & Holttum 1923
- Bulbophyllum minutum Thouars 1822
- Bulbophyllum mirabile Hallier f. 1889
- Bulbophyllum mirificum Schltr. 1918
- Bulbophyllum mirum J.J.Sm. 1906
- Bulbophyllum mischobulbon Schltr. 1913
- Bulbophyllum mobilifilum Carr 1929
- Bulbophyllum moldenkeanum A.D.Hawkes 1966
- Bulbophyllum molle J.J.Verm. & P.O'Byrne (2008)
- Bulbophyllum molossus Rchb.f. 1888
- Bulbophyllum mona-lisae Sieder & Kiehn (2009)
- Bulbophyllum monanthos Ridl. 1897
- Bulbophyllum moniliforme C.S.P.Parish & Rchb.f. 1874: Necklace Bulbophyllum
- Bulbophyllum monosema Schltr. 1913
- Bulbophyllum monstrabile Ames 1915
- Bulbophyllum montanum Schltr. 1913
- Bulbophyllum montense Ridl. ex Stapf 1894
- Bulbophyllum montisdischorense J.J.Verm., Schuit. & de Vogel (2014)
- Bulbophyllum moramanganum Schltr. 1922
- Bulbophyllum moratii Bosser 1989
- Bulbophyllum morenoi Dodson & R.Vásquez 1989
- Bulbophyllum moroides J.J.Sm. 1917
- Bulbophyllum morotaiense J.J.Sm. 1932
- Bulbophyllum morphologorum Kraenzl. 1908
- Bulbophyllum mucronatum (Blume) Lindl. 1830
  - Bulbophyllum mucronatum subsp. alagense (Ames) J.J.Verm. & P.O'Byrne (2011)
  - Bulbophyllum mucronatum subsp. mucronatum
- Bulbophyllum mucronifolium Rchb.f. & Warm. in H.G.Reichenbach 1881
- Bulbophyllum mulderae J.J.Verm. 1993
- Bulbophyllum multiflexum J.J.Sm. 1927
- Bulbophyllum multiflorum Ridl. 1885
- Bulbophyllum multiligulatum H.Perrier 1937
- Bulbophyllum multivaginatum Jum. & H.Perrier 1912
- Bulbophyllum muluense J.J.Wood (1984)
- Bulbophyllum muricatum J.J.Sm. 1911
- Bulbophyllum muriceum Schltr. 1913
- Bulbophyllum murkelense J.J.Sm. 1928
- Bulbophyllum muscarirubrum Seidenf. 1979
- Bulbophyllum muscicola Rchb.f. 1872
- Bulbophyllum muscohaerens J.J.Verm. & A.L.Lamb 1994
- Bulbophyllum mutabile (Blume) Lindl. 1830
- Bulbophyllum myodes J.J.Verm. (2008)
- Bulbophyllum myolaense Garay, Hamer & Siegerist 1995
- Bulbophyllum myon J.J.Verm. 1990
- Bulbophyllum myrmecochilum Schltr. 1924
- Bulbophyllum myrtillus Schltr. 1913
- Bulbophyllum mysorense (Rolfe) J.J.Sm. 1912
- Bulbophyllum mystax Schuit. & de Vogel 2002
- Bulbophyllum mystrochilum Schltr. 1913
- Bulbophyllum mystrophyllum Schltr. 1919

=== N ===
- Bulbophyllum nabawanense J.J.Wood & A.L.Lamb 1994
- Bulbophyllum nagelii L.O.Williams 1939
- Bulbophyllum namoronae Bosser 1971
- Bulbophyllum nannodes Schltr. in K.M.Schumann & C.A.G.Lauterbach 1905
- Bulbophyllum napellii Lindl. 1842
- Bulbophyllum nasica Schltr. 1913
- Bulbophyllum nasilabium Schltr. 1921
- Bulbophyllum nasseri Garay 1999
- Bulbophyllum nasutum Rchb.f. (1871)
- Bulbophyllum navicula Schltr. 1913
- Bulbophyllum naviculiforme P.O'Byrne & P.T.Ong (2014)
- Bulbophyllum nebularum Schltr. 1913
- Bulbophyllum neglectum Bosser 1965
- Bulbophyllum negrosianum Ames 1912
- Bulbophyllum nematocaulon Ridl. 1920
- Bulbophyllum nematopodum F.Muell. 1872 – green cowl orchid
- Bulbophyllum nematorhizis Schltr. 1913
- Bulbophyllum nemorale L.O.Williams 1938
- Bulbophyllum neoebudicum (Garay, Hamer & Siegerist) Sieder & Kiehn (2009)
- Bulbophyllum neoguineense J.J.Sm. 1908
- Bulbophyllum neopommeranicum Schltr. in K.M.Schumann & C.A.G.Lauterbach 1905
- Bulbophyllum neotorricellense J.M.H.Shaw (2014)
- Bulbophyllum nepalense Raskoti & Ale (2013)
- Bulbophyllum nervulosum Frapp. ex Cordem. 1895
- Bulbophyllum nesiotes Seidenf. 1979
- Bulbophyllum newportii (F.M.Bailey) Rolfe 1909 – cupped strand orchid
- Bulbophyllum ngoclinhensis Aver. 1997
- Bulbophyllum ngoyense Schltr. 1906
- Bulbophyllum nigericum Summerh. 1962
- Bulbophyllum nigrescens Rolfe 1910
- Bulbophyllum nigricans (Aver.) J.J.Verm., Schuit. & de Vogel (2014)
- Bulbophyllum nigriflorum H.Perrier 1937
- Bulbophyllum nigrilabium Schltr. 1913
- Bulbophyllum nigripetalum Rolfe 1891
- Bulbophyllum nigritianum Rendle 1913
- Bulbophyllum nipondhii Seidenf. 1985
- Bulbophyllum nitens Jum. & H.Perrier 1912
- Bulbophyllum nitidum Schltr. 1912: Shimmering Bulbophyllum
- Bulbophyllum nocturnum J. J. Verm., de Vogel, Schuit. & A. Vogel 2011
- Bulbophyllum nodosum (Rolfe) J.J.Sm. 1912
- Bulbophyllum notabilipetalum Seidenf. 1995
- Bulbophyllum novaciae J.J.Verm. & P.O'Byrne (2003)
- Bulbophyllum novae-hiberniae Schltr. in K.M.Schumann & C.A.G.Lauterbach 1905
- Bulbophyllum novemfilum P.O'Byrne & P.T.Ong (2014)
- Bulbophyllum nubigenum Schltr. 1913
- Bulbophyllum nubinatum J.J.Verm. 1988
- Bulbophyllum nujiangense X.H.Jin & W.T.Jin (2014)
- Bulbophyllum nummularia (H.Wendl. & Kraenzl.) Rolfe in D.Oliver 1897
- Bulbophyllum nummularioides Schltr. 1913
- Bulbophyllum nutans (Thouars) Thouars 1822
  - Bulbophyllum nutans var. nutans
  - Bulbophyllum nutans var. variifolium (Schltr.) Bosser 1965
- Bulbophyllum nymphopolitanum Kraenzl. (1916)

=== O ===
- Bulbophyllum oblanceolatum King & Pantl. 1897
- Bulbophyllum obliquum Schltr. 1911
- Bulbophyllum oblongum (Lindl.) Rchb.f. in W.G.Walpers (1861)
- Bulbophyllum obovatifolium J.J.Sm. 1912
- Bulbophyllum obovatum (J.J.Sm.) J.J.Verm., Schuit. & de Vogel (2014)
- Bulbophyllum obrienianum Rolfe (1892)
- Bulbophyllum obscuriflorum H.Perrier 1937
- Bulbophyllum obtusatum Schltr. 1924
- Bulbophyllum obtusipetalum J.J.Sm. 1905
- Bulbophyllum obtusum (Blume) Lindl. 1830
- Bulbophyllum obyrnei Garay, Hamer & Siegerist 1995
- Bulbophyllum occlusum Ridl. 1885
- Bulbophyllum occultum Thouars 1822
- Bulbophyllum ocellatum Cootes & M.A.Clem.8 (2011)
- Bulbophyllum ochroleucum Schltr. in K.M.Schumann & C.A.G.Lauterbach 1905
- Bulbophyllum ochroxanthum J.J.Verm. & A.L.Lamb (2013)
- Bulbophyllum ochthochilum J.J.Verm. 1993
- Bulbophyllum ochthodes J.J.Verm. 2002
- Bulbophyllum octarrhenipetalum J.J.Sm. 1913
- Bulbophyllum octorhopalon Seidenf. 1975
- Bulbophyllum odoardii Rchb.f. & Pfitzer 1884
- Bulbophyllum odontoglossum Schltr. 1913
- Bulbophyllum odontopelatum Schltr. 1913
- Bulbophyllum odontostigma J.J.Verm. (2008)
- Bulbophyllum odoratissimum (Sm.) Lindl. ex Hook.f. 1890: Fragrant Bulbophyllum
  - Bulbophyllum odoratissimum var. odoratissimum
  - Bulbophyllum odoratissimum var. racemosum N.P.Balakr. 1978
- Bulbophyllum odoratum (Blume) Lindl. 1830
- Bulbophyllum oeneum Burkill ex Ridl. (1924)
- Bulbophyllum oerstedii (Rchb.f.) Hemsl. (1884)
- Bulbophyllum oliganthum Schltr. 1913
- Bulbophyllum oligochaete Schltr. 1913
- Bulbophyllum oligoglossum Rchb.f. 1865
- Bulbophyllum olivinum J.J.Sm. 1934
  - Bulbophyllum olivinum subsp. linguiferum J.J.Verm. 1993
  - Bulbophyllum olivinum subsp. olivinum
- Bulbophyllum olorinum J.J.Sm. 1912
- Bulbophyllum omerandrum Hayata 1914
- Bulbophyllum oncopus J.J.Verm. & P.O'Byrne (2008)
- Bulbophyllum onivense H.Perrier 1937
- Bulbophyllum oobulbum Schltr. 1913
- Bulbophyllum ophiuchus Ridl. 1886
  - Bulbophyllum ophiuchus var. baronianum H.Perrier ex Hermans (2007)
  - Bulbophyllum ophiuchus var. ophiuchus
- Bulbophyllum orbiculare J.J.Sm. 1912
  - Bulbophyllum orbiculare subsp. cassideum (J.J.Sm.) J.J.Verm. 1993
  - Bulbophyllum orbiculare subsp. orbiculare
- Bulbophyllum orectopetalum Garay, Hamer & Siegerist 1992
- Bulbophyllum oreocharis Schltr. 1913
- Bulbophyllum oreodorum Schltr. 1924
- Bulbophyllum oreodoxa Schltr. 1913
- Bulbophyllum oreogenum Schltr. 1913
- Bulbophyllum oreogigas J.J.Verm., P.O'Byrne & A.L.Lamb (2015)
- Bulbophyllum oreomene J.J.Verm., Schuit. & de Vogel (2014)
- Bulbophyllum oreonastes Rchb.f. 1881
- Bulbophyllum orezii Sath.Kumar 2004
- Bulbophyllum orientale Seidenf. 1979: Eastern Bulbophyllum
- Bulbophyllum origami J.J.Verm. 1993
- Bulbophyllum ornatissimum (Rchb.f.) J.J.Sm. 1912
- Bulbophyllum ornatum Schltr. 1913
- Bulbophyllum orohense J.J.Sm. 1915
- Bulbophyllum orsidice Ridl. 1916
- Bulbophyllum ortalis J.J.Verm. 1993
- Bulbophyllum orthosepalum J.J.Verm. 1993: Straight-petaled Bulbophyllum
- Bulbophyllum osyricera Schltr. 1911
- Bulbophyllum osyriceroides J.J.Sm. 1920
- Bulbophyllum othonis (Kuntze) J.J.Sm. 1912
- Bulbophyllum otochilum J.J.Verm. 1991
- Bulbophyllum ovalifolium (Blume) Lindl. 1830: Oval-leafed Bulbophyllum
- Bulbophyllum ovatolanceatum J.J.Sm. 1928
- Bulbophyllum ovatum Seidenf. 1979
- Bulbophyllum oxyanthum Schltr. in K.M.Schumann & C.A.G.Lauterbach 1905
- Bulbophyllum oxycalyx Schltr. 1924
  - Bulbophyllum oxycalyx var. oxycalyx
  - Bulbophyllum oxycalyx var. rubescens (Schltr.) Bosser 1965
- Bulbophyllum oxychilum Schltr. 1905

=== P ===
- Bulbophyllum pachyacris J.J.Sm. 1908
- Bulbophyllum pachyanthum Schltr. 1906
- Bulbophyllum pachyglossum Schltr. 1919
- Bulbophyllum pachyneuron Schltr. 1911
- Bulbophyllum pachypus Schltr. 1924
- Bulbophyllum pachytelos Schltr. in K.M.Schumann & C.A.G.Lauterbach 1905
- Bulbophyllum pahudii (de Vriese) Rchb.f. in W.G.Walpers 1861
- Bulbophyllum paleiferum Schltr. 1924
- Bulbophyllum pallens (Jum. & Perrier) Schltr. 1924
- Bulbophyllum pallidulum J.J.Verm., Schuit. & de Vogel (2014)
- Bulbophyllum pallidum Seidenf. 1979
- Bulbophyllum pampangense Ames 1923
- Bulbophyllum pan Ridl. 1915
- Bulbophyllum pandanetorum Summerh. (1953 publ. 1954).
- Bulbophyllum pandurella Schltr. 1924
- Bulbophyllum pantoblepharon Schltr. 1924
  - Bulbophyllum pantoblepharon var. pantoblepharon
  - Bulbophyllum pantoblepharon var. vestitum H.Perrier ex Hermans (2007)
- Bulbophyllum papangense H.Perrier 1937
- Bulbophyllum papilio J.J.Sm. 1910
- Bulbophyllum papillatum J.J.Sm. 1910
- Bulbophyllum papillipetalum Ames 1922
- Bulbophyllum papillosofilum Carr 1929
- Bulbophyllum papuanum (Schltr.) J.J.Verm., Schuit. & de Vogel (2014)
- Bulbophyllum papuliferum Schltr. 1911
- Bulbophyllum papuliglossum Schltr. 1913
- Bulbophyllum papulipetalum Schltr. 1913
- Bulbophyllum papulosum Garay 1999: Warty Bulbophyllum
- Bulbophyllum parabates J.J.Verm. 1991
- Bulbophyllum paraemarginatum Aver. (2007)
- Bulbophyllum paranaense Schltr. 1919
  - Bulbophyllum paranaense var. paranaense
- Bulbophyllum pardalinum Ridl. 1916
- Bulbophyllum pardalotum Garay 1995
- Bulbophyllum parviflorum C.S.P.Parish & Rchb.f. 1874
- Bulbophyllum parvum Summerh. 1957
- Bulbophyllum patella J.J.Verm. 1993
- Bulbophyllum patens King ex Hook.f. 1896
- Bulbophyllum pauciflorum Ames 1912
- Bulbophyllum paucisetum J.J.Sm. 1915
- Bulbophyllum paulianum J.J.Verm., Schuit. & de Vogel (2014)
- Bulbophyllum paululum Schltr. 1913
- Bulbophyllum pauwelsianum Stévart & Droissart (2014)
- Bulbophyllum pauzii P.O'Byrne & P.T.Ong (2014)
- Bulbophyllum pecten-veneris (Gagnep.) Seidenf. (1973 publ. 1974):
- Bulbophyllum pectinatum Finet 1897
- Bulbophyllum pedilochilus J.J.Verm., Schuit. & de Vogel (2014)
- Bulbophyllum pelicanopsis J.J.Verm. & A.L.Lamb 1988
- Bulbophyllum peltopus Schltr. 1913
- Bulbophyllum pemae Schltr. 1913
- Bulbophyllum pendens J.J.Verm. (2008)
- Bulbophyllum penduliscapum J.J.Sm. 1900
- Bulbophyllum pendulum Thouars 1822
- Bulbophyllum penicillium C.S.P.Parish & Rchb.f. 1874: Brush-lipped Bulbophyllum
- Bulbophyllum peninsulare Seidenf. 1979: Peninsula Bulbophyllum
- Bulbophyllum pentaneurum Seidenf. 1979
- Bulbophyllum pentastichum (Pfitzer ex Kraenzl.) H.Perrier 1939
  - Bulbophyllum pentastichum subsp. pentastichum
  - Bulbophyllum pentastichum subsp. rostratum H.Perrier ex Hermans (2007)
- Bulbophyllum peperomiifolium J.J.Sm. 1918
- Bulbophyllum peramoenum Ames, Philipp. (1913 publ. 1914).
- Bulbophyllum percorniculatum H.Perrier 1951
- Bulbophyllum perexiguum Ridl. 1916
- Bulbophyllum perforans J.J.Sm. 1935
- Bulbophyllum perii Schltr. 1922
- Bulbophyllum perparvulum Schltr. 1915
- Bulbophyllum perpendiculare Schltr. 1911
- Bulbophyllum perpusillum H.Wendl. & Kraenzl. 1894
- Bulbophyllum perreflexum Bosser & P.J.Cribb 2001
- Bulbophyllum perrieri Schltr. 1913
- Bulbophyllum perryi J.J.Verm. & Kindler (2015)
- Bulbophyllum perseverans Hermans (2007)
- Bulbophyllum pervillei Rolfe ex Scott-Elliot 1891
- Bulbophyllum petiolare Thwaites 1861
- Bulbophyllum petiolatum J.J.Sm. 1910
- Bulbophyllum petioliferum J.J.Verm., Schuit. & de Vogel (2014)
- Bulbophyllum petrae G.A.Fisch., Sieder & P.J.Cribb (2007)
- Bulbophyllum petrophilum (P.Royen) J.J.Verm., Schuit. & de Vogel (2014)
- Bulbophyllum peyrotii Bosser 1965
- Bulbophyllum phaeanthum Schltr. 1911
- Bulbophyllum phaeoglossum Schltr. 1913
- Bulbophyllum phaeoneuron Schltr. 1911
- Bulbophyllum phaeorhabdos Schltr. 1923
- Bulbophyllum phalaenopsis J.J.Sm. 1937
- Bulbophyllum phayamense Seidenf. 1979
- Bulbophyllum phillipsianum Kores 1991
- Bulbophyllum phitamii Aver. (2017)
- Bulbophyllum phormion J.J.Verm. 1992
- Bulbophyllum phreatiopse J.J.Verm. 1993
- Bulbophyllum phymatum J.J.Verm. 1982
- Bulbophyllum physocoryphum Seidenf. 1979
- Bulbophyllum physometrum J.J.Verm., Suksathan & Watthana (2017)
- Bulbophyllum pictum C.S.P.Parish & Rchb.f. (1874)
- Bulbophyllum picturatum (Lodd.) Rchb.f. in W.G.Walpers 1861
- Bulbophyllum pidacanthum J.J.Verm. 1992
- Bulbophyllum piestobulbon Schltr. 1923
- Bulbophyllum piestoglossum J.J.Verm. 1993: Narrow-labellum Bulbophyllum
- Bulbophyllum pileatum Lindl. 1844: Fibery Bulbophyllum
- Bulbophyllum piliferum J.J.Sm. 1908
- Bulbophyllum pilosum J.J.Verm. 2002
- Bulbophyllum piluliferum King & Pantl. 1895
- Bulbophyllum pinelianum (A.Rich.) Ormerod (2016)
- Bulbophyllum pingnanense J.F.Liu, S.R.Lan & Y.C.Liang (2016)
- Bulbophyllum pingtungense S.S.Ying & S.C.Chen in S.S.Ying (1985)
- Bulbophyllum pinicolum Gagnep. 1930
- Bulbophyllum pipio Rchb.f. 1876
- Bulbophyllum pisibulbum J.J.Sm. 1914
- Bulbophyllum pitengoense Campacci (2010)
- Bulbophyllum piundaundense (P.Royen) J.J.Verm., Schuit. & de Vogel (2014)
- Bulbophyllum placochilum J.J.Verm. 1991
- Bulbophyllum plagiatum Ridl. 1916
- Bulbophyllum plagiopetalum Schltr. 1913
- Bulbophyllum planibulbe (Ridl.) Ridl. 1907
- Bulbophyllum planiplexum J.J.Verm. (2008)
- Bulbophyllum planitiae J.J.Sm. 1910
- Bulbophyllum platypodum H.Perrier 1937
- Bulbophyllum pleiopterum Schltr. 1912
- Bulbophyllum pleochromum J.J.Verm. & A.L.Lamb (2013)
- Bulbophyllum pleurocrepis J.J.Verm., Cootes & M.Perry (2017)
- Bulbophyllum pleurothallidanthum Garay 1999
- Bulbophyllum pleurothalloides Ames 1907
- Bulbophyllum pleurothallopsis Schltr. 1924
- Bulbophyllum plicatum J.J.Verm. 1993
- Bulbophyllum plumatum Ames 1915
- Bulbophyllum plumosum (Barb.Rodr.) Cogn. in C.F.P.von Martius 1902
- Bulbophyllum plumula Schltr. 1913
- Bulbophyllum pocillum J.J.Verm. 1991
- Bulbophyllum poekilon Carr 1932
- Bulbophyllum polliculosum Seidenf. 1973
- Bulbophyllum polyblepharon Schltr. in K.M.Schumann & C.A.G.Lauterbach 1905
- Bulbophyllum polycyclum J.J.Verm. 1996
- Bulbophyllum polyflorum J.M.H.Shaw (2016)
- Bulbophyllum polygaliflorum J.J.Wood 1984
- Bulbophyllum polyphyllum Schltr. 1913
- Bulbophyllum polyrrhizum Lindl. 1830
- Bulbophyllum polythyris J.J.Verm. & Sieder (2015)
- Bulbophyllum popayanense Kraenzl. 1899
- Bulbophyllum porphyrostachys Summerh. 1951
- Bulbophyllum porphyrotriche J.J.Verm. 1991
- Bulbophyllum posticum J.J.Sm. 1911
- Bulbophyllum potamophilum Schltr. 1913
- Bulbophyllum praetervisum J.J.Verm. 2002
- Bulbophyllum prianganense J.J.Sm. 1913
- Bulbophyllum prismaticum Thouars 1822
- Bulbophyllum pristis J.J.Sm. 1913
- Bulbophyllum proboscideum (Gagnep.) Seidenf. & Smitinand 1961
- Bulbophyllum proculcastris J.J.Verm. 2000
- Bulbophyllum propinquum Kraenzl. 1908
- Bulbophyllum prorepens Summerh. (1953 publ. 1954).
- Bulbophyllum protectum H.Perrier 1937
- Bulbophyllum protractum Hook.f. 1890
- Bulbophyllum proudlockii (King & Pantl.) J.J.Sm. 1912
- Bulbophyllum pseudoconiferum W.Suarez & Cootes (2009)
- Bulbophyllum pseudofilicaule J.J.Sm. 1935
- Bulbophyllum pseudohydra (Summerh.) J.M.H.Shaw (2016)
- Bulbophyllum pseudopelma J.J.Verm. & P.O'Byrne 2003
- Bulbophyllum pseudopicturatum (Garay) Sieder & Kiehn (2009)
- Bulbophyllum pseudoserrulatum J.J.Sm. 1912
- Bulbophyllum pseudotrias J.J.Verm. 1996
- Bulbophyllum psilorhopalon Schltr. 1913
- Bulbophyllum psittacoglossum Rchb.f. 1863
- Bulbophyllum psychrophilum (F.Muell.) J.J.Verm., Schuit. & de Vogel (2014)
- Bulbophyllum pteroglossum Schltr. (1919)
- Bulbophyllum pterostele J.J.Verm., P.O'Byrne & A.L.Lamb (2015)
- Bulbophyllum ptiloglossum H.Wendl. & Kraenzl. 1897
- Bulbophyllum ptilotes Schltr. 1913
- Bulbophyllum ptychantyx J.J.Verm. 1993
- Bulbophyllum ptychostigma J.J.Verm. (2008)
- Bulbophyllum pubiflorum Schltr. 1911
- Bulbophyllum pugilanthum J.J.Wood 1994
- Bulbophyllum puguahaanense Ames 1915
- Bulbophyllum puluongensis (Aver. & Averyanova) Sieder & Kiehn (2010 publ. 2011)
- Bulbophyllum pulvinatum Schltr. 1913
- Bulbophyllum pumilio C.S.P.Parish & Rchb.f. 1874
- Bulbophyllum pumilum (Sw.) Lindl. (1830)
- Bulbophyllum punamense Schltr. 1913
- Bulbophyllum punctatum Barb.Rodr. 1877
- Bulbophyllum pungens Schltr. 1913
- Bulbophyllum puntjakense J.J.Sm. 1907
- Bulbophyllum purpurascens Teijsm. & Binn. 1862
- Bulbophyllum purpurellum Ridl. 1916
- Bulbophyllum purpureofuscum J.J.Verm., Schuit. & de Vogel (2014)
- Bulbophyllum purpureorhachis (De Wild.) Schltr. 1914
- Bulbophyllum purpureum Thwaites 1861
- Bulbophyllum pusillum Thouars 1822
- Bulbophyllum pustulatum Ridl. 1898
- Bulbophyllum putaoensis Q.Liu (2017)
- Bulbophyllum putidum (Teijsm. & Binn.) J.J.Sm. 1912
- Bulbophyllum putii Seidenf. 1979
- Bulbophyllum pygmaeum (Sm.) Lindl. 1830
- Bulbophyllum pyridion J.J.Verm. 1991
- Bulbophyllum pyroglossum Schuit. & de Vogel (2005)

=== Q ===
- Bulbophyllum quadrangulare J.J.Sm. 1911
- Bulbophyllum quadrialatum H.Perrier 1939
- Bulbophyllum quadricarinum Kores 1989
- Bulbophyllum quadricaudatum J.J.Sm. 1911
- Bulbophyllum quadrichaete Schltr. 1913
- Bulbophyllum quadrifalciculatum J.J.Sm. 1929
- Bulbophyllum quadrifarium Rolfe 1903
- Bulbophyllum quadrisetum Lindl. 1843
- Bulbophyllum quadrisubulatum J.J.Sm. 1929
- Bulbophyllum quasimodo J.J.Verm. 1991
- Bulbophyllum quinquelobum Schltr. 1913

=== R ===
- Bulbophyllum radicans F.M.Bailey 1897 – striped pyjama orchid
- Bulbophyllum ramulicola Schuit. & de Vogel 2002
- Bulbophyllum ranomafanae Bosser & P.J.Cribb 2001
- Bulbophyllum rariflorum J.J.Sm. 1908
- Bulbophyllum rarum Schltr. 1913
- Bulbophyllum raskotii J.J.Verm., Schuit. & de Vogel (2014)
- Bulbophyllum rauhii Toill.-Gen. & Bosser 1961
  - Bulbophyllum rauhii var. andranobeense Bosser 1971
  - Bulbophyllum rauhii var. rauhii
- Bulbophyllum raui Arora (1969 publ. 1972)
- Bulbophyllum ravanii Cootes (2011)
- Bulbophyllum reclusum Seidenf. 1995
- Bulbophyllum rectilabre J.J.Sm. 1912
- Bulbophyllum recurviflorum J.J.Sm. 1903
- Bulbophyllum recurvilabre Garay 1999
- Bulbophyllum reductum J.J.Verm. & P.O'Byrne 2003
- Bulbophyllum reevei J.J.Verm. 1992
- Bulbophyllum reflexiflorum H.Perrier 1937
  - Bulbophyllum reflexiflorum subsp. pogonochilum (Summerh.) Bosser 2000
  - Bulbophyllum reflexiflorum subsp. reflexiflorum
- Bulbophyllum refractilingue J.J.Sm. 1931
- Bulbophyllum refractum (Zoll.) Rchb.f. in W.G.Walpers 1861
- Bulbophyllum reginaldoi Campacci (2009)
- Bulbophyllum regnellii Rchb.f. 1850
- Bulbophyllum reichenbachianum Kraenzl. 1893
- Bulbophyllum reichenbachii (Kuntze) Schltr. 1915
- Bulbophyllum reifii Sieder & Kieh (2009)
- Bulbophyllum remiferum Carr 1933
- Bulbophyllum remotifolium (Fukuy.) K.Nakaj. (1973)
- Bulbophyllum renipetalum Schltr. 1913
- Bulbophyllum renkinianum (Laurent) De Wild. 1921
- Bulbophyllum repens Griff. 1851
- Bulbophyllum reptans (Lindl.) Lindl. in N.Wallich 1829
- Bulbophyllum restrepia (Ridl.) Ridl. 1893
- Bulbophyllum resupinatum Ridl. 1887
  - Bulbophyllum resupinatum var. filiforme (Kraenzl.) J.J.Verm. 1986
  - Bulbophyllum resupinatum var. resupinatum
- Bulbophyllum reticulatum Bateman ex Hook.f. 1866
- Bulbophyllum retrorsum J.J.Verm. & A.L.Lamb (2008)
- Bulbophyllum retusiusculum Rchb.f. 1869
- Bulbophyllum rheedei Manilal & Sath.Kumar 1991
- Bulbophyllum rheophyton J.J.Verm. & Tsukaya (2011)
- Bulbophyllum rhizomatosum Ames & C.Schweinf. in O.Ames 1920
- Bulbophyllum rhodoglossum Schltr. 1913
- Bulbophyllum rhodoleucum Schltr. 1913
- Bulbophyllum rhodoneuron Schltr. 1913
- Bulbophyllum rhodophyllum J.J.Verm. & P.O'Byrne (2008)
- Bulbophyllum rhodosepalum Schltr. 1901
- Bulbophyllum rhodostachys Schltr. 1916
- Bulbophyllum rhomboglossum Schltr. 1913
- Bulbophyllum rhopaloblepharon Schltr. 1913
- Bulbophyllum rhopalophorum Schltr. 1913
- Bulbophyllum rhynchoglossum Schltr. 1910
- Bulbophyllum rictorium Schltr. (1925)
- Bulbophyllum rienanense H.Perrier 1937
- Bulbophyllum rigidifilum J.J.Sm. 1920
- Bulbophyllum rigidipes Schltr. in K.M.Schumann & C.A.G.Lauterbach 1905
- Bulbophyllum rigidum King & Pantl. 1895
- Bulbophyllum rimannii (Rchb.f.) J.J.Verm., Schuit. & de Vogel (2014)
- Bulbophyllum riparium J.J.Sm. 1929
- Bulbophyllum rivulare Schltr. 1913
- Bulbophyllum rolfei (Kuntze) Seidenf. 1979
- Bulbophyllum romburghii J.J.Sm. 1907
- Bulbophyllum romyi B.Thoms (2015)
- Bulbophyllum roraimense Rolfe 1896
- Bulbophyllum rosemarianum Sath.Kumar 2001
- Bulbophyllum roseopictum J.J.Verm., Schuit. & de Vogel (2014)
- Bulbophyllum roseopunctatum Schltr. 1913
- Bulbophyllum roseum Ridl. (1896)
- Bulbophyllum rostriceps Rchb.f. 1878
- Bulbophyllum rothschildianum (O'Brien) J.J.Sm. 1912: Rothschild's Bulbophyylum
- Bulbophyllum roxburghii (Lindl.) Rchb.f. in W.G.Walpers 1861
- Bulbophyllum rubiferum J.J.Sm. 1918
- Bulbophyllum rubiginosum Schltr. 1925
- Bulbophyllum rubipetalum P.Royen 1979
- Bulbophyllum rubrigemmum Hermans (2007)
- Bulbophyllum rubroguttatum Seidenf. 1985
- Bulbophyllum rubrolabellum T.P.Lin 1975
- Bulbophyllum rubrolabium Schltr. 1916
- Bulbophyllum rubrolineatum Schltr. 1923
- Bulbophyllum rubrolingue Cootes & Boos (2015)
- Bulbophyllum rubromaculatum W.Kittr. (1984 publ. 1985).
- Bulbophyllum rubrum Jum. & H.Perrier 1912
- Bulbophyllum rubusioides Naive, M.Leon & Cootes (2017)
- Bulbophyllum ruficaudatum Ridl. 1910
- Bulbophyllum rufilabrum C.S.P.Parish ex Hook.f. 1890
- Bulbophyllum rufinum Rchb.f. 1881
- Bulbophyllum ruginosum H.Perrier (1937)
- Bulbophyllum rugosibulbum Summerh. 1960
- Bulbophyllum rugosisepalum Seidenf. 1979
- Bulbophyllum rugosum Ridl. 1897
- Bulbophyllum rugulosum J.J.Sm. 1935
- Bulbophyllum rupicola Barb.Rodr. 1877
- Bulbophyllum rutenbergianum Schltr. 1924
- Bulbophyllum rutilans J.J.Verm. & A.L.Lamb, (2008)
- Bulbophyllum rutiliflorum J.J.Verm., Schuit. & de Vogel (2014)
- Bulbophyllum rysyanum Roeth (2007)

=== S ===
- Bulbophyllum saccoglossum J.J.Verm., Schuit. & de Vogel (2014)
- Bulbophyllum saccolabioides J.J.Sm. 1929
- Bulbophyllum sagemuelleri R.Bustam. & Kindler (2015)
- Bulbophyllum salaccense Rchb.f. 1857
- Bulbophyllum salmoneum Aver. & J.J.Verm. (2012)
- Bulbophyllum saltatorium Lindl. 1837: Dancing Bulbophyllum
  - Bulbophyllum saltatorium var. albociliatum (Finet) J.J.Verm. 1986
  - Bulbophyllum saltatorium var. calamarium (Lindl.) J.J.Verm. 1986
  - Bulbophyllum saltatorium var. saltatorium
- Bulbophyllum salmoneum Aver. & J.J.Verm. (2012)
- Bulbophyllum sambiranense Jum. & H.Perrier 1912
- Bulbophyllum samoanum Schltr. 1911: Samoan Bulbophyllum
- Bulbophyllum sanderianum Rolfe 1893
- Bulbophyllum sandersonii (Hook.f.) Rchb.f. 1878
  - Bulbophyllum sandersonii subsp. sandersonii
  - Bulbophyllum sandersonii subsp. stenopetalum (Kraenzl.) J.J.Verm. 1986
- Bulbophyllum sandrangatense Bosser 1965
- Bulbophyllum sangae Schltr. 1905
- Bulbophyllum sanguineomaculatum Ridl. (1896)
- Bulbophyllum sanguineopunctatum Seidenf. & A.D.Kerr (1973 publ. 1974)
- Bulbophyllum sanguineum H.Perrier 1937
- Bulbophyllum sanitii Seidenf. 1970
- Bulbophyllum sannio J.J.Verm. (2008)
- Bulbophyllum santoense J.J.Verm. 1993
- Bulbophyllum santosii Ames 1915: Santos' Bulbophyllum
- Bulbophyllum sapphirinum Ames 1915
- Bulbophyllum sarasinorum Schltr. 1925
- Bulbophyllum sarawaketense (P.Royen) J.J.Verm., Schuit. & de Vogel (2014)
- Bulbophyllum sarcanthiforme Ridl. 1916
- Bulbophyllum sarcochilum J.J.Verm. & P.O'Byrne (2008)
- Bulbophyllum sarcodanthum Schltr. 1913
- Bulbophyllum sarcophylloides Garay, Hamer & Siegerist 1994: Sarcophyllum-like Bulbophyllum
- Bulbophyllum sarcophyllum (King & Pantl.) J.J.Sm. 1912: Fleshy Red-leafed Bulbophyllum
- Bulbophyllum sarcorhachis Schltr. 1918
  - Bulbophyllum sarcorhachis var. befaonense (Schltr.) H.Perrier 1937
  - Bulbophyllum sarcorhachis var. flavomarginatum H.Perrier ex Hermans (2007)
  - Bulbophyllum sarcorhachis var. sarcorhachis
- Bulbophyllum sarcoscapum Teijsm. & Binn. 1867
- Bulbophyllum saronae Garay 1999
- Bulbophyllum sasakii (Hayata) J.J.Verm., Schuit. & de Vogel (2014)
- Bulbophyllum sauguetiense Schltr. 1913
- Bulbophyllum saurocephalum Rchb.f. 1886
  - Bulbophyllum saurocephalum subsp. oncoglossum W.Suarez (2011)
  - Bulbophyllum saurocephalum subsp. saurocephalum
- Bulbophyllum savaiense Schltr. 1911
  - Bulbophyllum savaiense subsp. gorumense (Schltr.) J.J.Verm. 1993
  - Bulbophyllum savaiense subsp. savaiense
  - Bulbophyllum savaiense subsp. subcubicum (J.J.Sm.) J.J.Verm. 1993
- Bulbophyllum sawiense J.J.Sm. 1912
- Bulbophyllum scaberulum (Rolfe) Bolus 1889: Slightly-roughened Bulbophyllum
  - Bulbophyllum scaberulum var. crotalicaudatum J.J.Verm. 1987
  - Bulbophyllum scaberulum var. fuerstenbergianum (De Wild.) J.J.Verm. 1986
  - Bulbophyllum scaberulum var. scaberulum
- Bulbophyllum scabratum Rchb.f. in W.G.Walpers 1861
- Bulbophyllum scabrum J.J.Verm. & A.L.Lamb 1988
- Bulbophyllum scaphiforme J.J.Verm. 2002
- Bulbophyllum scaphioglossum J.J.Verm. & Rysy, (2014)
- Bulbophyllum scaphosepalum Ridl. 1916
- Bulbophyllum scariosum Summerh. 1953
- Bulbophyllum sceliphron J.J.Verm. 1991
- Bulbophyllum schaiblei Cootes & Naive (2017)
- Bulbophyllum schefferi (Kuntze) Schltr. 1915
- Bulbophyllum schillerianum Rchb.f. 1860: Schiller's Bulbophyllum
- Bulbophyllum schimperianum Kraenzl. 1902
- Bulbophyllum schinzianum Kraenzl. 1899
  - Bulbophyllum schinzianum var. irigaleae (P.J.Cribb & Pérez-Vera) J.J.Verm. 1987
  - Bulbophyllum schinzianum var. phaeopogon (Schltr.) J.J.Verm. 1986
  - Bulbophyllum schinzianum var. schinzianum
- Bulbophyllum schistopetalum Schltr. in K.M.Schumann & C.A.G.Lauterbach 1905
- Bulbophyllum schizopetalum L.O.Williams 1946
- Bulbophyllum schmidii Garay 1999: Schmid's Bulbophyllum
- Bulbophyllum schmidtianum Rchb.f. 1865
- Bulbophyllum schuitemanii J.J.Verm. (2008)
- Bulbophyllum schwarzii Sieder & Kiehn (2010 publ. 2011).
- Bulbophyllum sciaphile Bosser 1965
- Bulbophyllum scintilla Ridl. 1908
- Bulbophyllum scopa J.J.Verm. 1990
- Bulbophyllum scopula Schltr. 1913
- Bulbophyllum scorpio J.J.Verm. (2008)
- Bulbophyllum scrobiculilabre J.J.Sm. 1914
- Bulbophyllum scutiferum J.J.Verm. 1993
- Bulbophyllum scyphochilus Schltr. 1912
- Bulbophyllum seabrense Campacci (2008)
- Bulbophyllum secundum Hook.f. 1890
- Bulbophyllum seidenfadenii A.D.Kerr (1973)
- Bulbophyllum semiasperum J.J.Sm. 1934
- Bulbophyllum semiindutum J.J.Verm. & P.O'Byrne (2008)
- Bulbophyllum semiteres Schltr. 1913
- Bulbophyllum semiteretifolium Gagnep. 1930
- Bulbophyllum semperflorens J.J.Sm. 1907
- Bulbophyllum sempiternum Ames 1920
- Bulbophyllum senghasii G.A.Fisch. & Sieder (2009)
- Bulbophyllum sensile Ames 1915
- Bulbophyllum sepikense W.Kittr. (1984 publ. 1985)
- Bulbophyllum septatum Schltr. 1924
- Bulbophyllum septemtrionale (J.J.Sm.) J.J.Sm. 1913
- Bulbophyllum serra Schltr. 1913: Toothed Bulbophyllum
- Bulbophyllum serratotruncatum Seidenf. (1973 publ. 1974)
- Bulbophyllum serripetalum Schltr. 1923
- Bulbophyllum serrulatifolium J.J.Sm. 1929
- Bulbophyllum serrulatum Schltr. in K.M.Schumann & C.A.G.Lauterbach 1905
- Bulbophyllum setaceum T.P.Lin 1975: Bristly Bulbophyllum
- Bulbophyllum setigerum Lindl. 1838
- Bulbophyllum setilabium Aver. (2017)
- Bulbophyllum setuliferum J.J.Verm. & Saw 2000
- Bulbophyllum shanicum King & Pantl. 1897
- Bulbophyllum shepherdii (F.Muell.) Rchb.f. 1871 – wheat-leaf rope orchid
- Bulbophyllum shweliense W.W.Sm. 1921
- Bulbophyllum sibuyanense Ames 1912
- Bulbophyllum sicyobulbon C.S.P.Parish & Rchb.f. 1874
- Bulbophyllum siederi Garay 1999: Sieder's Bulbophyllum
- Bulbophyllum sigaldiae Guillaumin 1955
- Bulbophyllum sigmoideum Ames & C.Schweinf. in O.Ames 1920
- Bulbophyllum signatum J.J.Verm. 1996
- Bulbophyllum sikapingense J.J.Sm. 1920
- Bulbophyllum silentvalliensis M.P.Sharma & S.K.Srivast. 1993
- Bulbophyllum sillemianum Rchb.f. 1884
- Bulbophyllum simii J.J.Verm. & A.L.Lamb (2008)
- Bulbophyllum simile Schltr.1913
- Bulbophyllum similissimum J.J.Verm. 1991
- Bulbophyllum simmondsii Kores 1989
- Bulbophyllum simondii Gagnep. 1950
- Bulbophyllum simplex J.J.Verm. & P.O'Byrne 2003
- Bulbophyllum simplicilabellum Seidenf. 1979
- Bulbophyllum simulacrum Ames 1915
- Bulbophyllum sinapis J.J.Verm. & P.O'Byrne 2003
- Bulbophyllum singaporeanum Schltr. 1911
- Bulbophyllum singulare Schltr. 1913
- Bulbophyllum sinhoense Aver. (2007)
- Bulbophyllum skeatianum Ridl. 1915
- Bulbophyllum smileiphyllum J.J.Verm., Schuit. & de Vogel (2014)
- Bulbophyllum smithianum Schltr. 1911
- Bulbophyllum smitinandii Seidenf. & Thorut 1996
- Bulbophyllum socordine J.J.Verm. & Cootes (2008)
- Bulbophyllum soidaoense (Seidenf.) J.J.Verm., Schuit. & de Vogel (2014)
- Bulbophyllum solteroi R.González 1992
- Bulbophyllum somae Hayata (1920)
- Bulbophyllum sopoetanense Schltr. 1911: Mt. Sopoetan Bulbophyllum
- Bulbophyllum sordidum Lindl. 1840
- Bulbophyllum sororculum J.J.Verm. 2002
- Bulbophyllum spadiciflorum Tixier 1966
- Bulbophyllum spaniostagon J.J.Verm., Schuit. & de Vogel (2014)
- Bulbophyllum spathilingue J.J.Sm. 1908
- Bulbophyllum spathipetalum J.J.Sm. 1908
- Bulbophyllum spathulatum (Rolfe ex E.Cooper) Seidenf. 1970
- Bulbophyllum speciosum Schltr. 1912
- Bulbophyllum sphaenopus J.J.Verm. (2008)
- Bulbophyllum sphaeracron Schltr. 1913
- Bulbophyllum sphaericum Z.H.Tsi & H.Li 1981
- Bulbophyllum sphaerobulbum H.Perrier 1937
- Bulbophyllum spissum J.J.Verm. 1996
- Bulbophyllum spodotriche J.J.Verm. & P.O'Byrne (2008)
- Bulbophyllum spongiola J.J.Verm. 1996
- Bulbophyllum stabile J.J.Sm. 1911
- Bulbophyllum staetophyton J.J.Verm. (2008)
- Bulbophyllum stalagmotelos J.J.Verm. (2008)
- Bulbophyllum stelis J.J.Sm. 1927
- Bulbophyllum stellatum Ames 1912
- Bulbophyllum stellula Ridl. 1916
- Bulbophyllum stellulamontis J.J.Verm. & A.L.Lamb (2013)
- Bulbophyllum stemonochilum J.J.Verm. (2008)
- Bulbophyllum stenobulbon C.S.P.Parish & Rchb.f. 1874: Slender-bulbed Bulbophyllum
- Bulbophyllum stenochilum Schltr. 1913
- Bulbophyllum stenomeris J.J.Verm. & P.O'Byrne (2008).
- Bulbophyllum stenophyllum C.S.P.Parish & Rchb.f. 1874
- Bulbophyllum stenophyton (Garay & W.Kittr.)
- Bulbophyllum stenorhopalon Schltr. 1921
- Bulbophyllum stenuroides J.J.Verm. & P.O'Byrne (2011)
- Bulbophyllum stenurum J.J.Verm. & P.O'Byrne 2003
- Bulbophyllum sterile (Lam.) Suresh in D.H.Nicolson, C.R.Suresh & K.S.Manilal 1988
- Bulbophyllum steyermarkii Foldats 1968
- Bulbophyllum stictanthum Schltr. 1913
- Bulbophyllum stictosepalum Schltr. 1913
- Bulbophyllum stipitatibulbum J.J.Sm. 1931
- Bulbophyllum stipulaceum Schltr. in K.M.Schumann & C.A.G.Lauterbach 1905
- Bulbophyllum stockeri J.J.Verm. (2008)
- Bulbophyllum stocksii (Benth. ex Hook.f.) J.J.Verm., Schuit. & de Vogel (2014)
- Bulbophyllum stolleanum Schltr. 1923
- Bulbophyllum stolzii Schltr. 1915
- Bulbophyllum stormii J.J.Sm. 1907
- Bulbophyllum streptomorphum J.J.Verm., P.O'Byrne & A.L.Lamb (2015)
- Bulbophyllum streptotriche J.J.Verm. 1991
- Bulbophyllum striatellum Ridl. 1890
- Bulbophyllum striatulum Aver. (2016)
- Bulbophyllum striatum (Griff.) Rchb.f. in W.G.Walpers 1861
- Bulbophyllum strigosum (Garay) Sieder & Kiehn (2009)
- Bulbophyllum stylocoryphe J.J.Verm. & P.O'Byrne (2008)
- Bulbophyllum suavissimum Rolfe 1889
- Bulbophyllum subaequale Ames 1923
- Bulbophyllum subapetalum J.J.Sm. 1915
- Bulbophyllum subapproximatum H.Perrier 1937
- Bulbophyllum subbullatum J.J.Verm. 1996
- Bulbophyllum subclausum J.J.Sm. 1909
- Bulbophyllum subclavatum Schltr. 1925
- Bulbophyllum subcrenulatum Schltr. 1925
- Bulbophyllum subligaculiferum J.J.Verm. 1987
- Bulbophyllum submarmoratum J.J.Sm. 1918
- Bulbophyllum subpatulum J.J.Verm. 2002
- Bulbophyllum subsecundum Schltr. 1916
- Bulbophyllum subsessile Schltr. 1924
- Bulbophyllum subtrilobatum Schltr. 1913
- Bulbophyllum subumbellatum Ridl. 1896
- Bulbophyllum succedaneum J.J.Sm. 1927
- Bulbophyllum sukhakulii Seidenf. 1995
- Bulbophyllum sulcatum (Blume) Lindl. 1830
- Bulbophyllum sulfureum Schltr. 1924
- Bulbophyllum sunipia J.J.Verm., Schuit. & de Vogel (2014)
- Bulbophyllum superfluum Kraenzl. 1929
- Bulbophyllum surigaense Ames & Quisumb. (1933 publ. 1934)
- Bulbophyllum sutepense (Rolfe ex Downie) Seidenf. & Smitinand 1961

=== T ===
- Bulbophyllum taeniophyllum C.S.P.Parish & Rchb.f. 1874
- Bulbophyllum taeter J.J.Verm. 1996
- Bulbophyllum tahanense Carr 1930
- Bulbophyllum tahitense Nadeaud 1873
  - Bulbophyllum tahitense subsp. butaudianum Marg. (2012)
  - Bulbophyllum tahitense subsp. tahitense
- Bulbophyllum taiwanense (Fukuy.) K.Nakaj. 1973
- Bulbophyllum takeuchii (Howcroft) J.J.Verm., Schuit. & de Vogel (2014)
- Bulbophyllum talauense (J.J.Sm.) Carr 1932
- Bulbophyllum tampoketsense H.Perrier 1937
- Bulbophyllum tanystiche J.J.Verm. 1993
- Bulbophyllum tapeinophyton J.J.Verm., Schuit. & de Vogel (2014)
- Bulbophyllum tarantula Schuit. & de Vogel (2005)
- Bulbophyllum tardeflorens Ridl. 1896
- Bulbophyllum tectipes J.J.Verm. & P.O'Byrne 2003
- Bulbophyllum tectipetalum J.J.Sm. 1929
- Bulbophyllum teimosense E.C.Smidt & Borba (2009)
- Bulbophyllum teinophyllum J.J.Verm., Schuit. & de Vogel (2014)
- Bulbophyllum tekuense Carr 1930
- Bulbophyllum tengchongense Z.H.Tsi 1989
- Bulbophyllum tentaculatum Schltr. 1913
- Bulbophyllum tentaculiferum Schltr. 1913
- Bulbophyllum tenue Schltr. 1913
- Bulbophyllum tenuifolium (Blume) Lindl. 1830
- Bulbophyllum tenuipes Schltr. 1913
- Bulbophyllum tenuislinguae T.P.Lin & Shu H.Wu (2012)
- Bulbophyllum teretibulbum H.Perrier 1937
- Bulbophyllum teretifolium Schltr. 1905
- Bulbophyllum teretilabre J.J.Sm. 1913
- Bulbophyllum terrestre (J.J.Sm.) J.J.Verm., Schuit. & de Vogel (2014)
- Bulbophyllum tetragonum Lindl. 1830
- Bulbophyllum thaiorum J.J.Sm. 1912
- Bulbophyllum thecanthum J.J.Verm. (2008)
- Bulbophyllum theiochromum J.J.Verm., Schuit. & de Vogel (2014)
- Bulbophyllum theioglossum Schltr. 1913
- Bulbophyllum thelantyx J.J.Verm. 1993
- Bulbophyllum therezienii Bosser 1971
- Bulbophyllum thersites J.J.Verm. 1993
- Bulbophyllum theunissenii J.J.Sm. 1920
- Bulbophyllum thiurum J.J.Verm. & P.O'Byrne (2005)
- Bulbophyllum thompsonii Ridl. 1885
- Bulbophyllum thrixspermiflorum J.J.Sm. 1908
- Bulbophyllum thrixspermoides J.J.Sm. 1912
- Bulbophyllum thwaitesii Rchb.f. 1874
- Bulbophyllum thymophorum J.J.Verm. & A.L.Lamb 1988
- Bulbophyllum tianguii K.Y.Lang & D.Luo (2007)
- Bulbophyllum tigridum Hance (1883)
- Bulbophyllum tindemansianum J.J.Verm., de Vogel & A.Vogel (2010)
- Bulbophyllum tinekeae Schuit. & de Vogel (2005)
- Bulbophyllum tipula Aver. (2016)
- Bulbophyllum titanea Ridl. 1908
- Bulbophyllum tixieri Seidenf. 1992
- Bulbophyllum toilliezae Bosser 1965
- Bulbophyllum tokioi Fukuy. 1935
- Bulbophyllum toppingii Ames (1913 publ. 1914)
- Bulbophyllum torajarum J.J.Verm. & P.O'Byrne (2008)
- Bulbophyllum toranum J.J.Sm. 1912
- Bulbophyllum torquatum J.J.Sm. 1929
- Bulbophyllum torricellense Schltr. 1913
- Bulbophyllum tortum Schltr. 1913
- Bulbophyllum tortuosum (Blume) Lindl. 1830
- Bulbophyllum tothastes J.J.Verm. (1991)
- Bulbophyllum trachyanthum Kraenzl. 1894
- Bulbophyllum trachybracteum Schltr. 1913
- Bulbophyllum trachyglossum Schltr. in K.M.Schumann & C.A.G.Lauterbach 1905
- Bulbophyllum trachypus Schltr. 1913
- Bulbophyllum translucidum Kindler, R.Bustam. & Ferreras (2016)
- Bulbophyllum tremulum Wight 1851
- Bulbophyllum treschii Jenny (2012)
- Bulbophyllum triadenium (Lindl.) Rchb.f. in W.G.Walpers 1861
- Bulbophyllum triaristella Schltr. 1913
- Bulbophyllum tricanaliferum J.J.Sm. 1913
- Bulbophyllum tricarinatum Petch 1923
- Bulbophyllum tricaudatum J.J.Verm. (2008)
- Bulbophyllum trichaete Schltr. 1913
- Bulbophyllum trichochlamys H.Perrier 1937
- Bulbophyllum trichorhachis J.J.Verm. & P.O'Byrne 2003
- Bulbophyllum trichromum Schltr. 1923
- Bulbophyllum triclavigerum J.J.Sm. 1913
- Bulbophyllum tricolor L.B.Sm. & S.K.Harris 1936
- Bulbophyllum tricorne Seidenf. & Smitinand 1965
- Bulbophyllum tricornoides Seidenf. 1979
- Bulbophyllum tridentatum Kraenzl. 1901: Three-toothed Bulbophyllum
- Bulbophyllum trifarium Rolfe 1910
- Bulbophyllum trifilum J.J.Sm. 1908
  - Bulbophyllum trifilum subsp. filisepalum (J.J.Sm.) J.J.Verm. (2002 publ. 2003)
  - Bulbophyllum trifilum subsp. trifilum
- Bulbophyllum triflorum (Breda) Blume 1828
- Bulbophyllum trifolium Ridl. 1897
- Bulbophyllum trigonidioides J.J.Sm. 1935
- Bulbophyllum trigonobulbum Schltr. & J.J.Sm. 1914
- Bulbophyllum trigonocarpum Schltr. in K.M.Schumann & C.A.G.Lauterbach 1905
- Bulbophyllum trigonopus (Rchb.f.) P.T.Ong (2017)
- Bulbophyllum trigonosepalum Kraenzl. (1921)
- Bulbophyllum trilineatum H.Perrier 1937
- Bulbophyllum trimenii (Hook.f.) J.J.Sm. 1912
- Bulbophyllum trinervium J.J.Sm. 1935
- Bulbophyllum trineuron J.J.Verm. & A.L.Lamb (2013)
- Bulbophyllum tripetalum Lindl. 1842
- Bulbophyllum tripudians C.S.P.Parish & Rchb.f. 1875
- Bulbophyllum trirhopalon Schltr. 1913
- Bulbophyllum triste Rchb.f. in W.G.Walpers 1861
- Bulbophyllum tristelidium W.Kittr. (1984 publ. 1985)
- Bulbophyllum tristriatum Carr (1930)
- Bulbophyllum triviale Seidenf. 1979
- Bulbophyllum tropidopous J.J.Verm., P.O'Byrne & A.L.Lamb (2015)
- Bulbophyllum trulliferum J.J.Verm. & A.L.Lamb 1994
- Bulbophyllum truncatum J.J.Sm. 1913
- Bulbophyllum tryssum J.J.Verm. & A.L.Lamb 1994
- Bulbophyllum tseanum (S.Y.Hu & Barretto) Z.H.Tsi 1999
- Bulbophyllum tsekourioides M.Leon, Naive & Cootes (2017)
- Bulbophyllum tsii J.J.Verm., Schuit. & de Vogel (2014)
- Bulbophyllum tuberculatum Colenso 1884
- Bulbophyllum tubilabrum J.J.Verm. & P.O'Byrne 2003
- Bulbophyllum tumidum J.J.Verm. 1991
- Bulbophyllum tumoriferum Schltr. 1913
- Bulbophyllum turgidum J.J.Verm. 1991
- Bulbophyllum turkii Bosser & P.J.Cribb 2001
- Bulbophyllum turpe J.J.Verm. & P.O'Byrne 2003
- Bulbophyllum tylophorum Schltr. 1911

=== U ===
- Bulbophyllum uhl-gabrielianum Chiron & V.P.Castro (2009)
- Bulbophyllum umbellatum Lindl. 1830: Umbrella Bulbophyllum
  - Bulbophyllum umbellatum var. fuscescens (Hook.f.) P.K.Sarkar 1984
  - Bulbophyllum umbellatum var. umbellatum
- Bulbophyllum uncinatum J.J.Verm. & P.O'Byrne 2003
- Bulbophyllum unciniferum Seidenf. 1973
- Bulbophyllum undatilabre J.J.Sm. 1912
- Bulbophyllum undecifilum J.J.Sm. 1927
- Bulbophyllum unguiculatum Rchb.f. 1850
- Bulbophyllum unguilabium Schltr. 1913
- Bulbophyllum unicaudatum Schltr. 1913
  - Bulbophyllum unicaudatum var. unicaudatum
  - Bulbophyllum unicaudatum var. xanthosphaerum Schltr. 1913
- Bulbophyllum uniflorum (Blume) Hassk. 1844
- Bulbophyllum unifoliatum De Wild. 1921
  - Bulbophyllum unifoliatum subsp. flectens (P.J.Cribb & P.Taylor) J.J.Verm. 1987
  - Bulbophyllum unifoliatum subsp. infracarinatum (G.Will.) J.J.Verm. 1987
  - Bulbophyllum unifoliatum subsp. unifoliatum
- Bulbophyllum unitubum J.J.Sm. 1929
- Bulbophyllum univenum J.J.Verm. 1993
- Bulbophyllum upupops J.J.Verm., P.O'Byrne & A.L.Lamb (2015)
- Bulbophyllum urceolatum A.D.Hawkes 1952
- Bulbophyllum uroglossum Schltr. 1921
- Bulbophyllum uroplatoides Hermans & G.A.Fisch. (2009)
- Bulbophyllum urosepalum Schltr. 1913
- Bulbophyllum ustusfortiter J.J.Verm. 1993
- Bulbophyllum uviflorum P.O'Byrne 1999

=== V ===
- Bulbophyllum vaccinioides Schltr. 1913
- Bulbophyllum vagans Ames & Rolfe 1907
- Bulbophyllum vaginatum (Lindl.) Rchb.f. in W.G.Walpers 1861
- Bulbophyllum vakonae Hermans (2007)
- Bulbophyllum valeryi J.J.Verm. & P.O'Byrne 2003
- Bulbophyllum validum Carr 1933
- Bulbophyllum vanroyenii J.J.Verm., Schuit. & de Vogel, (2014)
- Bulbophyllum vanum J.J.Verm. 1984
- Bulbophyllum vanvuurenii J.J.Sm. 1917
- Bulbophyllum vareschii Foldats 1968
- Bulbophyllum variculosum J.J.Verm. (2008)
- Bulbophyllum variegatum Thouars 1822
- Bulbophyllum veitchianum Garay ex W.E.Higgins (2009)
- Bulbophyllum veldkampii J.J.Verm. & P.O'Byrne (2011)
- Bulbophyllum ventriosum H.Perrier 1937
- Bulbophyllum venulosum J.J.Verm. & A.L.Lamb (2008)
- Bulbophyllum vermiculare Hook.f. 1890
- Bulbophyllum verruciferum Schltr. 1913
  - Bulbophyllum verruciferum var. carinatisepalum Schltr. 1913
  - Bulbophyllum verruciferum var. verruciferum
- Bulbophyllum verrucosum (L.O.Williams) J.J.Verm., Schuit. & de Vogel (2014)
- Bulbophyllum verruculatum Schltr. 1913
- Bulbophyllum verruculiferum H.Perrier 1951
- Bulbophyllum versteegii J.J.Sm. 1908
- Bulbophyllum vesiculosum J.J.Sm. 1917
- Bulbophyllum vespertilio Ferreras & Cootes (2010)
- Bulbophyllum vestigipetalum J.J.Verm. & A.L.Lamb (2013)
- Bulbophyllum vestitum Bosser 1971
  - Bulbophyllum vestitum var. meridionale Bosser 1971
  - Bulbophyllum vestitum var. vestitum
- Bulbophyllum vexillarium Ridl. 1916
- Bulbophyllum vietnamense Seidenf. 1975
- Bulbophyllum viguieri Schltr. 1922
- Bulbophyllum violaceolabellum Seidenf. 1981
- Bulbophyllum violaceum (Blume) Lindl. 1830
- Bulbophyllum virens (Lindl.) Hook.f. (1890)
- Bulbophyllum viridescens Ridl. (1908)
- Bulbophyllum viridiflorum (Hook.f.) Schltr. 1910
- Bulbophyllum vitellinum Ridl. 1897
- Bulbophyllum vittatum Teijsm. & Binn. 1862
- Bulbophyllum vulcanicum Kraenzl. 1914
- Bulbophyllum vulcanorum H.Perrier 1938
- Bulbophyllum vutimenaense B.A.Lewis 1992

=== W ===
- Bulbophyllum wadsworthii Dockrill 1964 – yellow rope orchid
- Bulbophyllum wagneri Schltr. 1921
- Bulbophyllum wakoi Howcroft 1999
- Bulbophyllum wallichii Rchb.f. in W.G.Walpers 1861
- Bulbophyllum wangkaense Seidenf. 1979
- Bulbophyllum warianum Schltr. 1913
- Bulbophyllum weberbauerianum Kraenzl. 1905
- Bulbophyllum weberi Ames 1912
- Bulbophyllum wechsbergii Sieder & Kiehn (2009)
- Bulbophyllum weddelii (Lindl.) Rchb.f. in W.G.Walpers 1861: Weddel's Bulbophyllum
- Bulbophyllum weinthalii R.S.Rogers 1933: Weinthal's Bulbophyllum
  - Bulbophyllum weinthalii subsp. striatum D.L.Jones 2001
  - Bulbophyllum weinthalii subsp. weinthalii
- Bulbophyllum wendlandianum (Kraenzl.) J.J.Sm. 1912
- Bulbophyllum werneri Schltr. 1913
- Bulbophyllum wightii Rchb.f. in W.G.Walpers 1861
- Bulbophyllum wilkianum T.E.Hunt 1947
- Bulbophyllum williamsii A.D.Hawkes 1956
- Bulbophyllum windsorense B.Gray & D.L.Jones 1989 – thread-tipped rope orchid
- Bulbophyllum woelfliae Garay, Senghas & K.Lemcke 1996
- Bulbophyllum wolfei B.Gray & D.L.Jones 1991 – fleshy snake orchid
- Bulbophyllum wollastonii Ridl. 1916
- Bulbophyllum wrayi Hook.f. 1890
- Bulbophyllum wuzhishanense X.H.Jin (2005)

=== X ===
- Bulbophyllum xantanthum Schltr. 1911
- Bulbophyllum xanthoacron J.J.Sm. 1911
- Bulbophyllum xanthobulbum Schltr. 1918
- Bulbophyllum xanthochlamys Schltr. 1913
- Bulbophyllum xanthochloron J.J.Verm. (2014)
- Bulbophyllum xanthomelanon J.J.Verm. & P.O'Byrne (2008)
- Bulbophyllum xanthophaeum Schltr. 1913
- Bulbophyllum xanthornis Schuit. & de Vogel 2002
- Bulbophyllum xanthotes Schltr. 1913
- Bulbophyllum xanthum Ridl. 1920
- Bulbophyllum xenosum J.J.Verm. 1996
- Bulbophyllum xiajinchuangense Z.J.Liu, L.J.Chen & W.H.Rao (2010)
- Bulbophyllum xiphion J.J.Verm. 1996
- Bulbophyllum xylinopus J.J.Verm., P.O'Byrne & A.L.Lamb (2015)
- Bulbophyllum xylophyllum C.S.P.Parish & Rchb.f. 1874
- Bulbophyllum xyphoglossum J.J.Verm., de Vogel & A.Vogel (2010)

=== Y ===
- Bulbophyllum yingjiangense B.M.Wang & J.W.Zhai (2017)
- Bulbophyllum yoksunense J.J.Sm. 1912
- Bulbophyllum yunnanense Rolfe 1901

=== Z ===
- Bulbophyllum zambalense Ames 1912
- Bulbophyllum zamboangense Ames (1913 publ. 1914)
- Bulbophyllum zaratananae Schltr. 1924
  - Bulbophyllum zaratananae subsp. disjunctum H.Perrier ex Herman (2007)
  - Bulbophyllum zaratananae subsp. zaratananae
- Bulbophyllum zebrinum J.J.Sm. 1911
- Bulbophyllum zophyranthum J.J.Verm., Schuit. & de Vogel (2014)
- Bulbophyllum zygochilum J.J.Verm. (2008)
