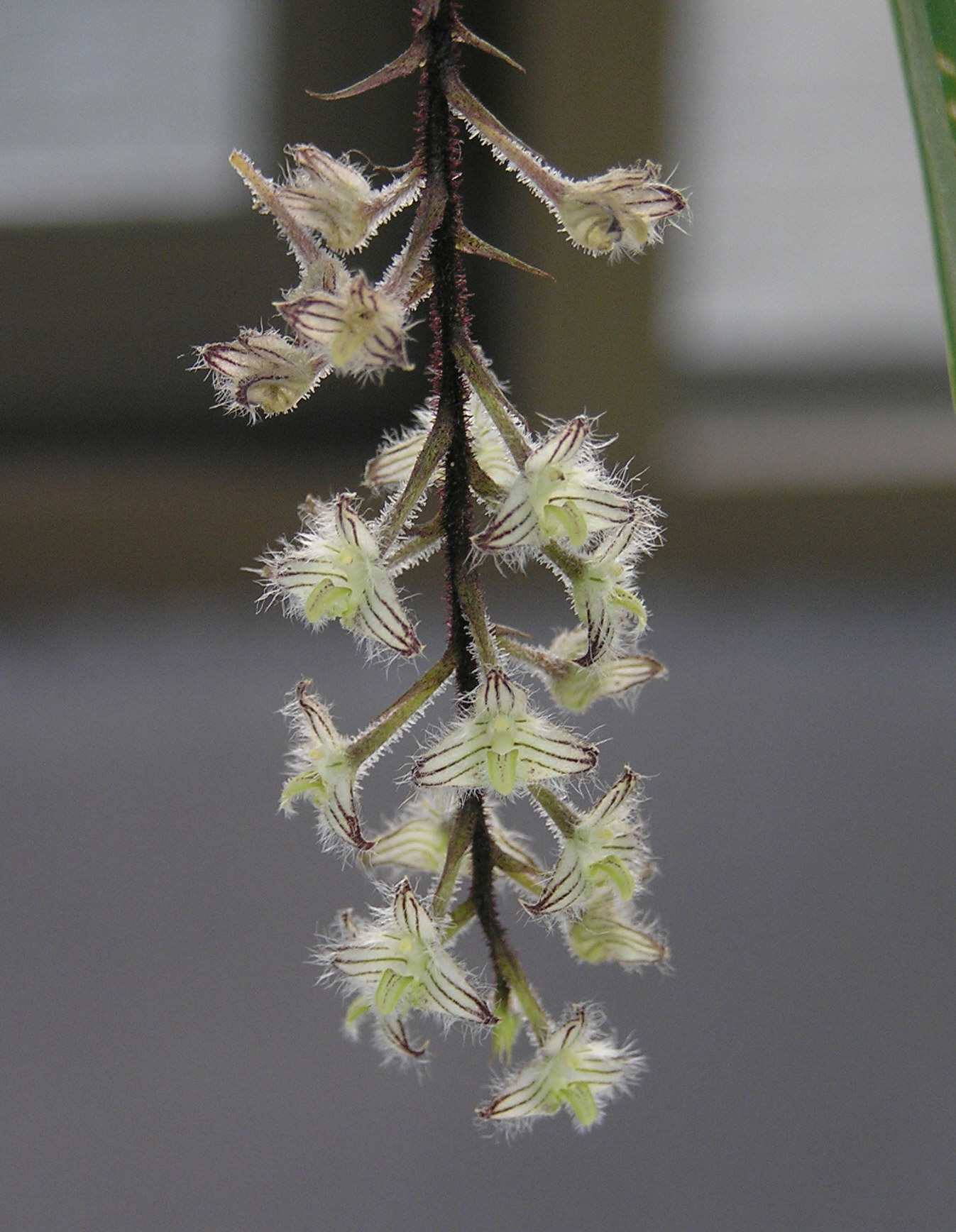

Scientific classification
- Kingdom: Plantae
- Clade: Tracheophytes
- Clade: Angiosperms
- Clade: Monocots
- Order: Asparagales
- Family: Orchidaceae
- Subfamily: Epidendroideae
- Genus: Bulbophyllum
- Section: Bulbophyllum sect. Hirtula; Ridl., 1908

Type species
- Bulbophyllum hirtulum

Species
- See text

= Bulbophyllum sect. Hirtula =

Section of flowering plants

Bulbophyllum sect. Hirtula is a section of the genus Bulbophyllum.

== Description ==
Species in this section are Epiphytic or lithophytic perennial herbs, creeping rhizomatic, 1-leaved subglobular or oblate pseudobulbs. Inflorescence many flowered raceme or spike, often with swollen rachis, flowers with 4 paired pollina.

== Distribution ==
Plants from this section are found in Nepal, Bhutan, NE. India, Myanmar, South China, Thailand, Peninsular Malaysia, Sumatra, Java, Borneo, Sulawesi, Philippines, New Guinea.

== Species ==
Bulbophyllum section Hirtula comprises the following species:

Image	Name	Distribution	Elevation (m)
	Bulbophyllum aithorhachis J.J.Verm 1996	Brunei, Borneo and Sumatra	50–800 metres (160–2,620 ft)
	Bulbophyllum anguste-ellipticum Seidenf. 1981	Thailand	
	Bulbophyllum atratum J.J.Sm. 1917	Malaysia, Sumatra and Borneo (Sabah)	1,000 metres (3,300 ft)
	Bulbophyllum carinilabium J.J.Verm. 1991	Borneo (Sabah)	1,500–2,000 metres (4,900–6,600 ft)
	Bulbophyllum cerebellum J J Verm 1996	Borneo (Sabah)	1,300 metres (4,300 ft)
	Bulbophyllum clipeibulbum J.J.Verm. 2001	Indochina, Vietnam	700–1,500 metres (2,300–4,900 ft)
	Bulbophyllum comberipictum J J Verm 2002	Sarawak and Sabah Borneo	800–1,300 metres (2,600–4,300 ft)
	Bulbophyllum concavilabium P.O'Byrne & P.T.Ong 2014	peninsular Malaysia and Sarawak Borneo	
	Bulbophyllum debrincatiae J.J.Verm. 2002	Philippines	800–1,200 metres (2,600–3,900 ft)
	Bulbophyllum dracunculus J.J.Verm. 2000	Borneo (Sabah)	800–1,800 metres (2,600–5,900 ft)
	Bulbophyllum dasystachys J.J.Verm., Thavipoke & J.Phelps 2014	Thailand, Vietnam	1,450 metres (4,760 ft)
	Bulbophyllum echinochilum Kraenzl. 1921	Sulawesi, Philippines	900–1,000 metres (3,000–3,300 ft)
	Bulbophyllum eleiosurum J J Verm. & O'Byrne 2015	Borneo	700 metres (2,300 ft)
	Bulbophyllum glabrichelia Aver. 2017	Laos, Vietnam	1,050–1,150 metres (3,440–3,770 ft)
	Bulbophyllum gemma-reginae J J Verm. 1996	Borneo	1,100–1,200 metres (3,600–3,900 ft)
	Bulbophyllum groeneveldtii J.J.Sm. 1920	Sumatra and Borneo	1,100–1,300 metres (3,600–4,300 ft)
	Bulbophyllum grotianum J.J.Verm. 2002	Sarawak Borneo	0–250 metres (0–820 ft)
	Bulbophyllum hirtulum Ridl. 1900	Malaysia, Sumatra and Borneo	400–1,300 metres (1,300–4,300 ft)
	Bulbophyllum janus J.J.Verm. 2002	Sumatra	650–950 metres (2,130–3,120 ft)
	Bulbophyllum jolandae J.J.Verm. 1991	Borneo	1,500 metres (4,900 ft)
	Bulbophyllum kenchungianum P.O'Byrne & Gokusing 2016	Borneo	700 metres (2,300 ft)
	Bulbophyllum lanuginosum J.J.Verm. 2002	Thailand	
	Bulbophyllum lasioglossum Rolfe ex Ames 1905	Philippines	1,000 metres (3,300 ft)
	Bulbophyllum limbatum Lindl. 1840	Myanmar, Thailand, Malaysia, Borneo and Sumatra	500–600 metres (1,600–2,000 ft)
	Bulbophyllum lindleyanum Griff. 1851	India, Thailand and Myanmar	
	Bulbophyllum mirabile Hallier 1896	Brunei, Borneo (Kalimantan and Sabah)	200–300 metres (660–980 ft)
	Bulbophyllum negrosianum Ames 1912	Philippines	1,100–1,400 metres (3,600–4,600 ft)
	Bulbophyllum nigrescens Rolfe 1910	Thailand, Yunnan Province China and Vietnam	400–1,500 metres (1,300–4,900 ft)
	Bulbophyllum nigripetalum Rolfe 1891	Yunnan Province China and Thailand	1,000–1,300 metres (3,300–4,300 ft)
	Bulbophyllum ochthodes J.J.Verm. 2002	Malaysia	1,500 metres (4,900 ft)
	Bulbophyllum parviflorum C.S.P.Parish & Rchb.f. 1874	Eastern Himalayas, Bhutan, Myanmar, Thailand and Vietnam	400–1,100 metres (1,300–3,600 ft)
	Bulbophyllum penicillium Parish & Rchb. f. 1874	Assam India, eastern Himalayas, Sikkim, Myanmar, Thailand and Vietnam	2,000 metres (6,600 ft)
	Bulbophyllum phitamii Aver. 2017	Vietnam	
	Bulbophyllum pilosum J.J.Verm. 2002	Borneo (Sabah)	1,300–1,500 metres (4,300–4,900 ft)
	Bulbophyllum polycyclum J.J.Verm. 1996	Borneo	850–1,700 metres (2,790–5,580 ft)
	Bulbophyllum polygaliflorum J.J.Wood 1984	Borneo	1,700 metres (5,600 ft)
	Bulbophyllum rariflorum J.J.Sm. 1908	Borneo	
	Bulbophyllum scaphiforme J.J.Vermuellen 2002	Thailand, Vietnam and China Yunnan	1,100–1,400 metres (3,600–4,600 ft)
	Bulbophyllum secundum Hook.f. 1890	Assam India, eastern Himalayas, Nepal, Bhutan, Sikkim, Southern China, Myanmar, Thailand, Laos and Vietnam	1,000–2,500 metres (3,300–8,200 ft)
	Bulbophyllum setilabium Aver. 2017	Laos, Vietnam	1,100–1,200 metres (3,600–3,900 ft)
	Bulbophyllum setuliferum J.J.Verm. & Saw 2000	Peninsular Malaysia	1,500–1,800 metres (4,900–5,900 ft)
	Bulbophyllum sororculum J.J.Verm. 2002	Sulawesi	500 metres (1,600 ft)
	Bulbophyllum spadiciflorum Tixier 1966	Vietnam	500–1,000 metres (1,600–3,300 ft)
	Bulbophyllum tremulum Wight 1844-53	India	800–1,000 metres (2,600–3,300 ft)
	Bulbophyllum trulliferum J J Verm & Lamb 1994	Borneo (Sabah)	900 metres (3,000 ft)
	Bulbophyllum xenosum J.J.Verm. 1996	peninsular Malaysia and Borneo	650–900 metres (2,130–2,950 ft)
	Bulbophyllum xiphion J.J.Verm. 1996	Borneo	650–1,050 metres (2,130–3,440 ft)
