= Mirabile =

- Mirabile, from the Latin, means "wonderful" or "miraculous"
- Mirabile (novel), a science fiction novel by Janet Kagan, and the eponymous planet on which the novel is set
- Mirabile, Missouri, a community in the United States
- Mirabile illud, a Papal Encyclical
- Rete mirabile, an anatomical feature
- Horologium mirabile Lundense, a 15th-century astronomical clock

== Biological names ==
- Acer mirabile
- Bulbophyllum mirabile
- Calliotectum mirabile
- Capsicum mirabile
- Cyclamen mirabile
- Glaziophyton mirabile
- Hydnellum mirabile
- Opisthostoma mirabile
- Planetetherium mirabile
- Pseudoditrichum mirabile
- Pontiothauma mirabile
- Speagonum mirabile
- Taraxacum mirabile
- Tropidion mirabile
- Typhonium mirabile
- Vexillum mirabile
