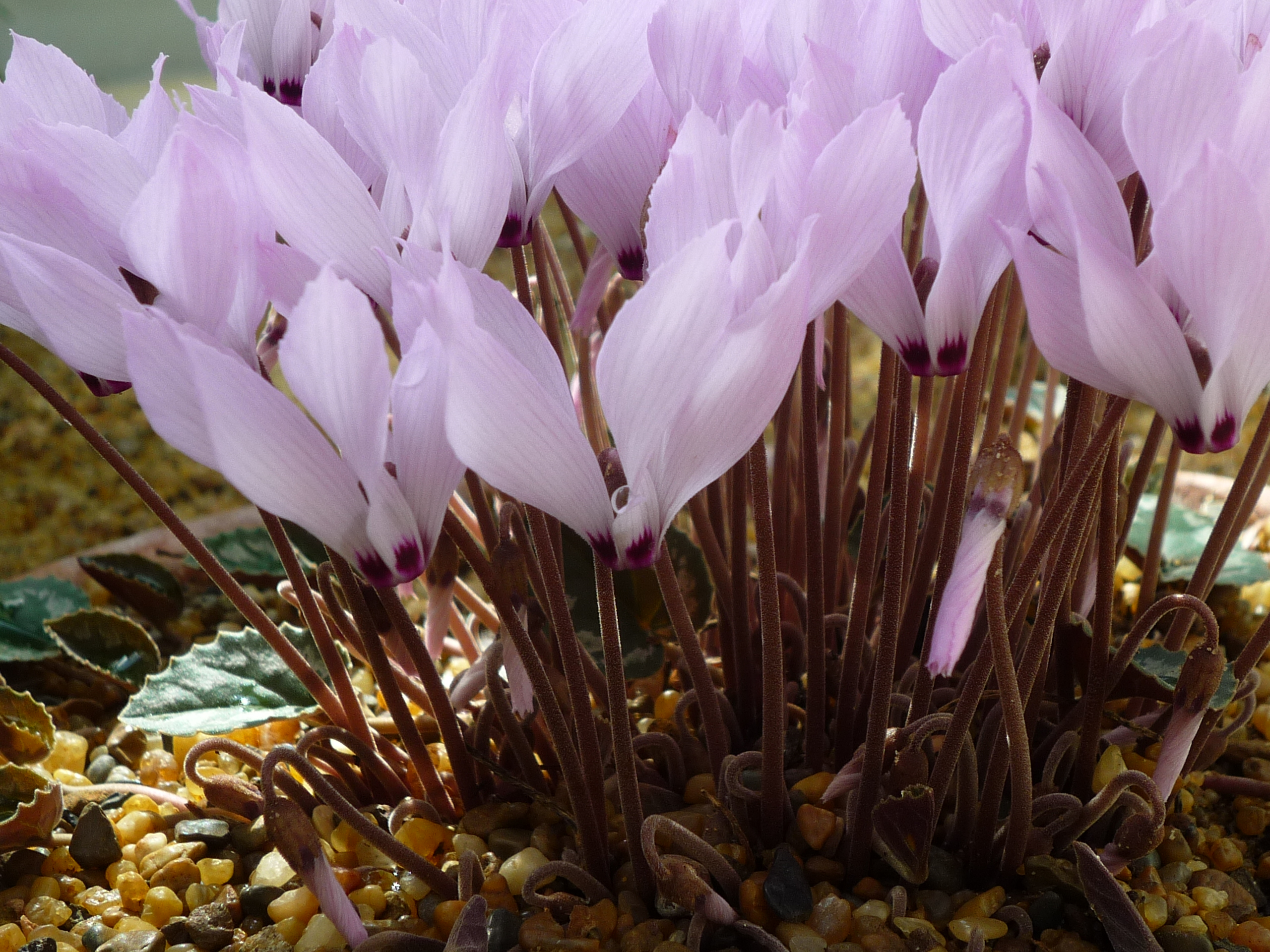

Scientific classification
- Kingdom: Plantae
- Clade: Tracheophytes
- Clade: Angiosperms
- Clade: Eudicots
- Clade: Asterids
- Order: Ericales
- Family: Primulaceae
- Genus: Cyclamen
- Subgenus: C. subg. Gyrophoebe
- Species: C. mirabile

Binomial name
- Cyclamen mirabile Hildebr.

= Cyclamen mirabile =

Species of flowering plant

Cyclamen mirabile, sowbread, is a species of flowering plant in the primrose family Primulaceae. A tufted, tuberous herbaceous perennial growing to 10 cm (3.9 in), it is native to Turkish pine woodland and maquis in southwestern Turkey. It belongs to the Cyclamen cilicium group of the genus Cyclamen (subgenus Gyrophoebe, series Cilicium). The species was identified and named in 1906.

The Latin specific epithet mirabile means "miraculous", referring to the blooms which appear as if by magic from the bare earth.

== Description ==
The tuber is round-flattened and roots irregularly from the lower surface.

The leaves, appearing with the flowers or after they have emerged, are broad heart-shaped, and as wide or wider than long. Cyclamen intaminatum is wider than long, but Cyclamen cilicium is longer than wide. The leaf edge is shallowly toothed; in the closely related Cyclamen cilicium and Cyclamen intaminatum, the edge is wavy or smooth. Leaf color is dark green with a variable "Christmas tree" pattern in lighter green or silver. The silver zone often starts out pink-tinged in young leaves.

The flowers, appearing in Autumn, are often fragrant with a coconut scent. Flower color is white to deep pink, often with a magenta blotch at the base of each petal. Cyclamen cilicium also has a blotch, but Cyclamen intaminatum does not. The petal edges are toothed, particularly near the tip. Cyclamen intaminatum has slight petal toothing as well, but Cyclamen cilicium usually has none.

In cultivation this plant has proved reasonably hardy, tolerating temperatures as low as −10 °C (14 °F) when planted in a suitable setting. It grows best in well-drained soil that dries out in the dormant period (summer). As it dislikes cool wet summers, it may fare better in a pot in an unheated greenhouse. It has gained the Royal Horticultural Society's Award of Garden Merit. (confirmed 2017).

== Subdivisions ==
=== Forms ===
Cyclamen mirabile has two naturally occurring forms, distinguished by flower color:

- Cyclamen mirabile f. mirabile — pale to deep pink flowers with dark blotches
- Cyclamen mirabile f. niveum — all-white flowers

=== Cultivars ===
There are several cultivars of Cyclamen mirabile:

- Cyclamen mirabile 'Tilebarn Anne' has silvery leaves with etched veins that are tinged with pink when young, and pink flowers.
- Cyclamen mirabile 'Tilebarn Jan' (named after Jan Ietswaart of the Netherlands, who sent seed to Peter Moore at Tilebarn Nursery) has been selected for white flowers; some seedlings are pure white, while others have a pale pink nose.
- Cyclamen mirabile 'Tilebarn Nicholas' has leaves with a dark green Christmas tree–shaped center surrounded by a broad band of silver. The silver band is deep pink in young leaves.
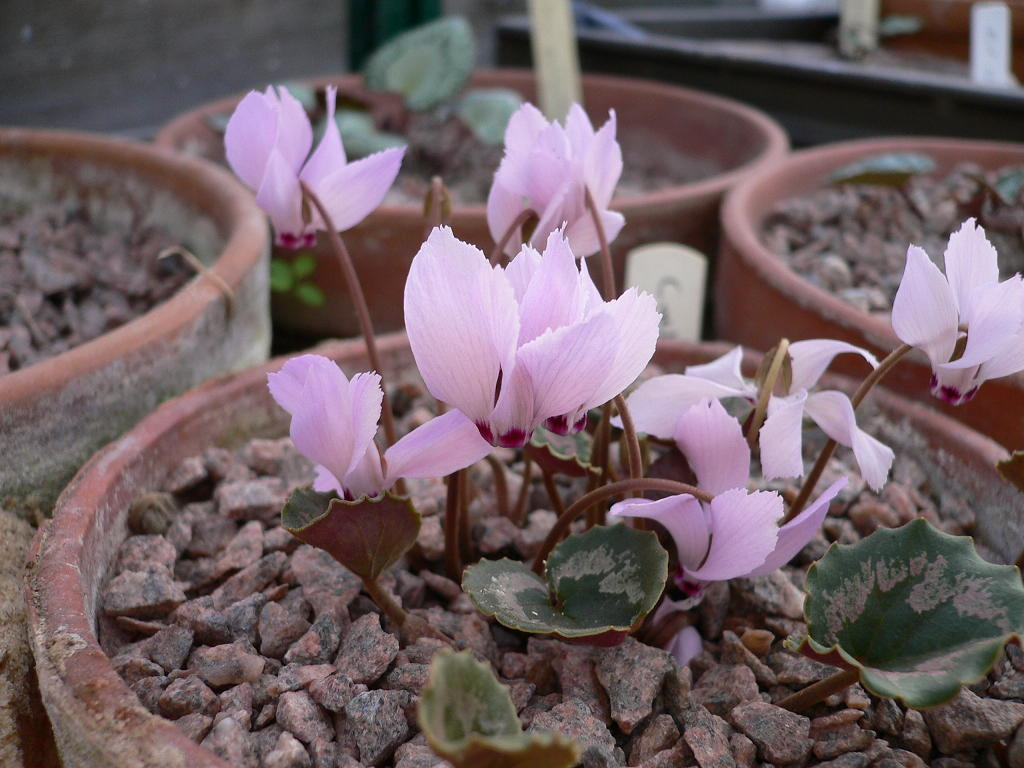
Cyclamen mirabile

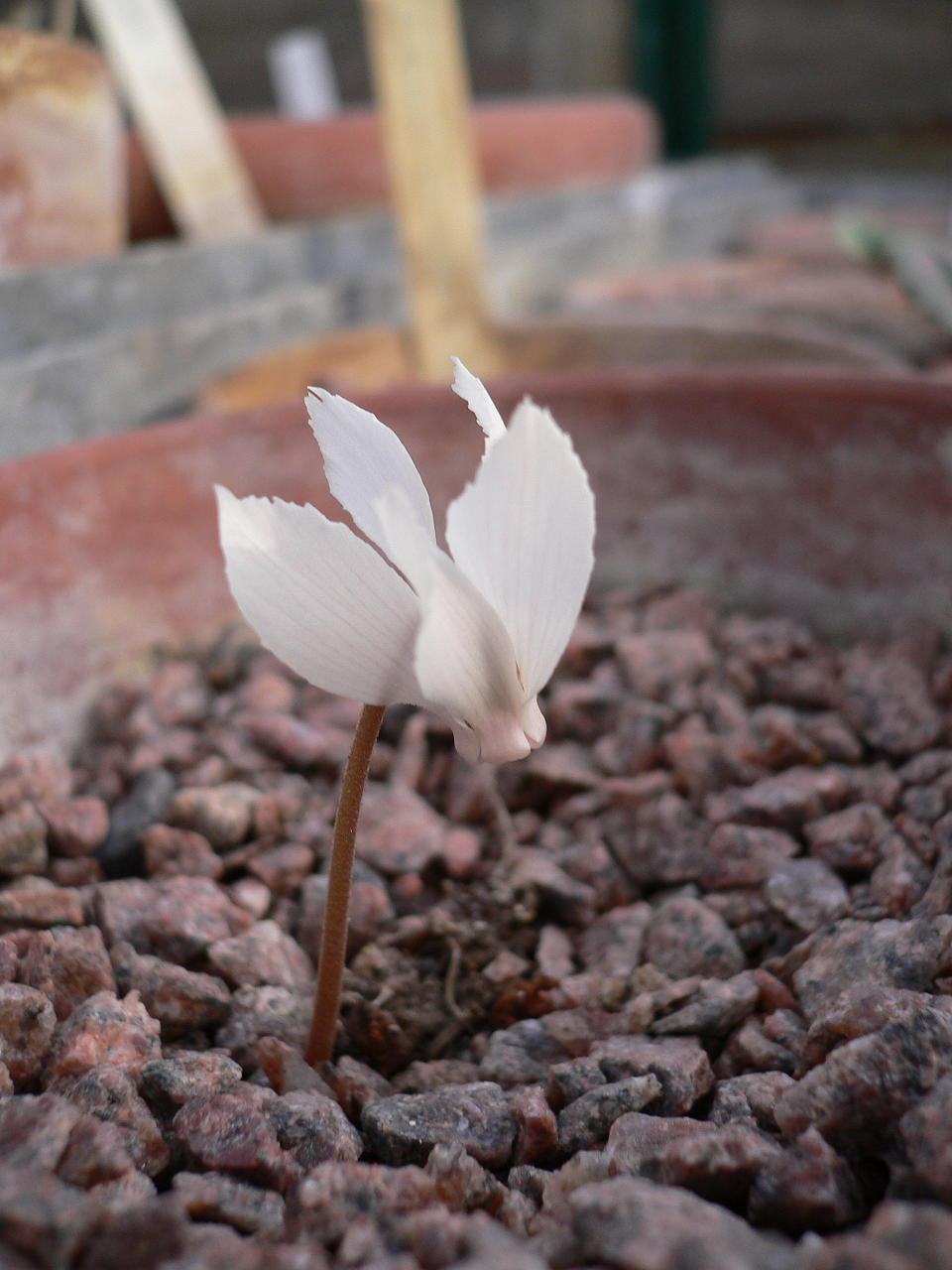
Cyclamen mirabile 'Tilebarn Jan'

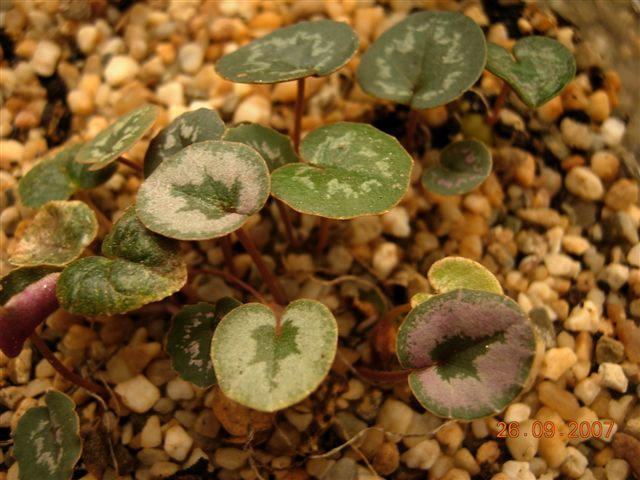
Cyclamen mirabile 'Tilebarn Nicholas'
