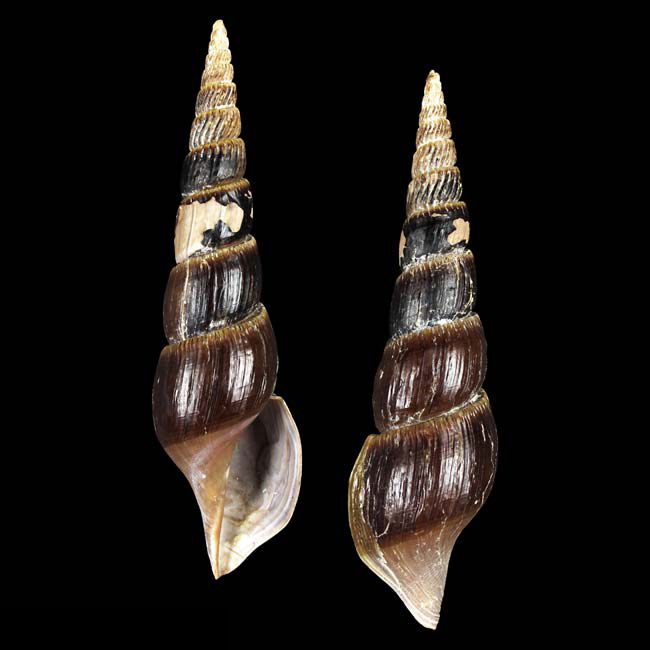

Scientific classification
- Kingdom: Animalia
- Phylum: Mollusca
- Class: Gastropoda
- Subclass: Caenogastropoda
- Order: Neogastropoda
- Family: Volutidae
- Genus: Calliotectum
- Species: C. dalli

Binomial name
- Calliotectum dalli (Bartsch, 1942)

= Calliotectum dalli =

Species of gastropod

Calliotectum dalli is a species of sea snail, a marine gastropod mollusk in the family Volutidae, the volutes.
