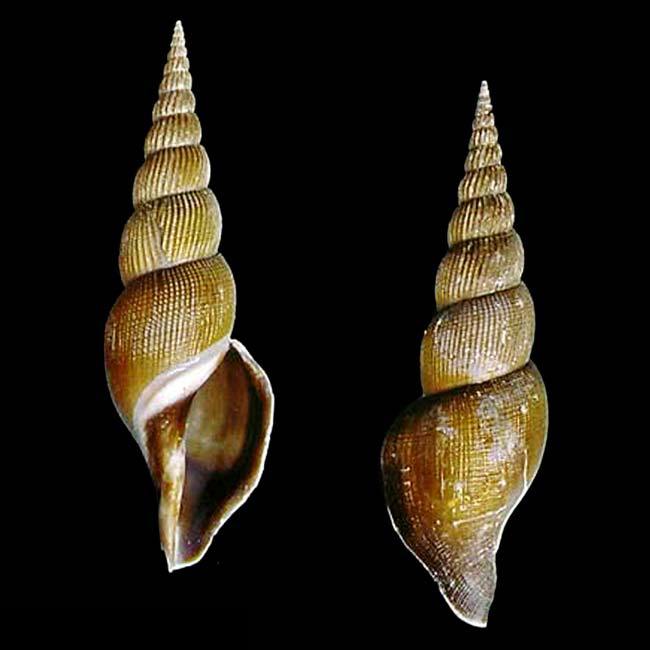
- Shell of Calliotectum egregium

Scientific classification
- Kingdom: Animalia
- Phylum: Mollusca
- Class: Gastropoda
- Subclass: Caenogastropoda
- Order: Neogastropoda
- Superfamily: Volutoidea
- Family: Volutidae
- Genus: Calliotectum; Dall, 1890

Synonyms
- † Butonius K. Martin, 1933; Howellia Clench & Aguayo, 1941; Mangilia (Calliotectum) Dall, 1890; † Pakaurangia Finlay, 1926; Prodallia Bartsch, 1942; Teramachia Kuroda, 1931

= Calliotectum =

Genus of gastropods

Calliotectum is a genus of sea snails, marine gastropod mollusks in the family Volutidae.

The genus was first described by William Healey Dall in 1890.

== Description ==
The shell shows a dark vernicose periostracum. There is no differentiated siphonal canal, anal sulcus or fasciole. The shell is axially ribbed. The columella is thin and twisted. The axis is impervious. The outer lip is simple, arcuate, thin, not internally lirate. The operculum is like that of Fusinus, but arcuate. The animal is blind, without radula or poison gland. Type species: Calliotectum vernicosum Dall, 1890.

== Distribution ==
Species of the genus are found off Taiwan, in the East China Sea, Vanuatu, Indonesia, Loyalty Islands, New Caledonia, Philippines, Eastern Pacific, Galapagos Islands, Lubang Island, Wallis and Futuna, Kermadec Islands, Chesterfield Isles, East China Sea, Indonesia, in the Arafura Sea, and off the northern and western coasts of Australia.

== Species ==
Species within the genus Calliotectum include:

- Calliotectum dalli (Bartsch, 1942)
- Calliotectum egregium Bouchet & Poppe, 1995
- Calliotectum mirabile (Clench & Aguayo, 1941)
- Calliotectum piersonorum Bouchet & Poppe, 1995
- Calliotectum smithi (Bartsch, 1942)
- Calliotectum tibiaeforme (Kuroda, 1931)
- Calliotectum vernicosum Dall, 1890
