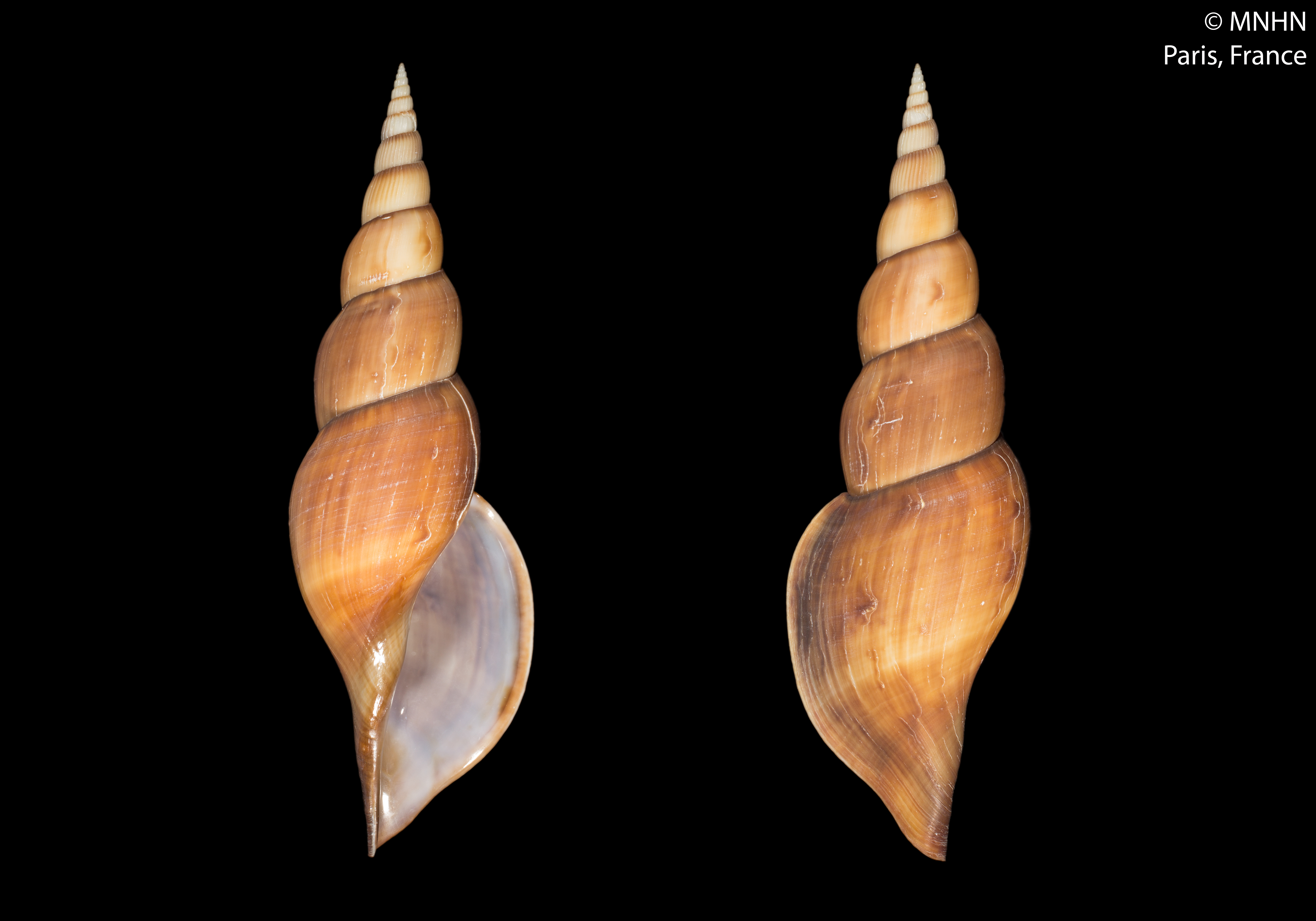
- Shell of Calliotectum tibiaeforme barneli (specimen at MNHN, Paris)

Scientific classification
- Kingdom: Animalia
- Phylum: Mollusca
- Class: Gastropoda
- Subclass: Caenogastropoda
- Order: Neogastropoda
- Family: Volutidae
- Genus: Calliotectum
- Species: C. tibiaeforme

Binomial name
- Calliotectum tibiaeforme (Kuroda, 1931)

Synonyms
- Calliotectum tibiaeforme dupreyae (Emerson, 1985); Calliotectum tibiaeforme tibiaeforme (Kuroda, 1931)· accepted, alternate representation; Teramachia dupreyae Emerson, 1985; Teramachia dupreyae arafurensis Douté, 1988; Teramachia dupreyae busseltonensis Douté, 1995; Teramachia johnsoni Bartsch, 1942; Teramachia williamsorum Rehder, 1972

= Calliotectum tibiaeforme =

Species of gastropod

Calliotectum tibiaeforme is a species of sea snail, a marine gastropod mollusk in the family Volutidae, the volutes.

Subspecies

- Calliotectum tibiaeforme barneli Bail, 2006
- Calliotectum tibiaeforme johnsoni (Bartsch, 1942)
- Calliotectum tibiaeforme williamsorum (Rehder, 1972)

== Distribution ==
This marine species occurs off the Philippines.
