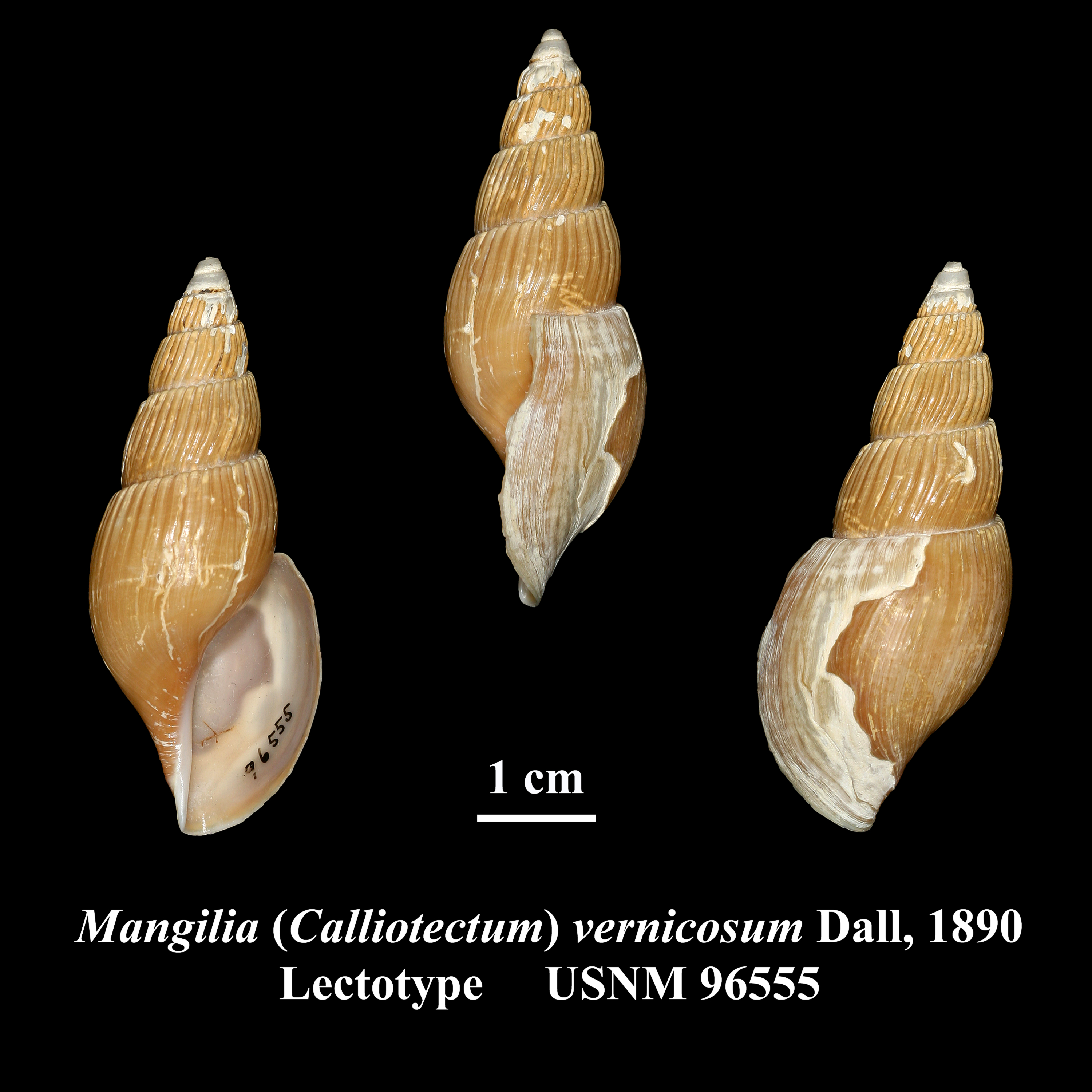

Scientific classification
- Kingdom: Animalia
- Phylum: Mollusca
- Class: Gastropoda
- Subclass: Caenogastropoda
- Order: Neogastropoda
- Family: Volutidae
- Genus: Calliotectum
- Species: C. vernicosum

Binomial name
- Calliotectum vernicosum Dall, 1890

= Calliotectum vernicosum =

Species of gastropod

Calliotectum vernicosum is a species of sea snail, a marine gastropod mollusk in the family Volutidae, the volutes.
