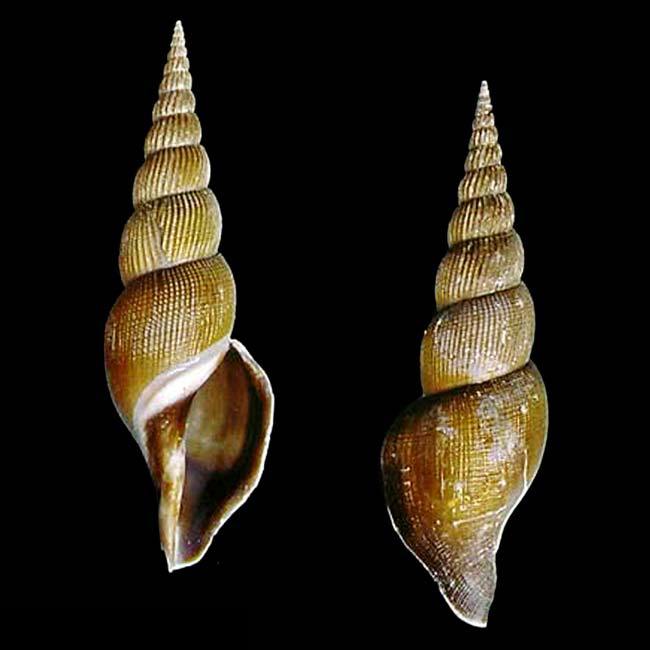

Scientific classification
- Kingdom: Animalia
- Phylum: Mollusca
- Class: Gastropoda
- Subclass: Caenogastropoda
- Order: Neogastropoda
- Family: Volutidae
- Genus: Calliotectum
- Species: C. egregium

Binomial name
- Calliotectum egregium Bouchet & Poppe, 1995

= Calliotectum egregium =

Species of gastropod

Calliotectum egregium is a species of sea snail, a marine gastropod mollusk in the family Volutidae, the volutes.

== Description ==
- Bouchet, P.; Poppe, G. T. (1995). A review of the deep-water volute genus Calliotectum (Gastropoda: Volutidae). in: Bouchet, P. (Ed.) Résultats des Campagnes MUSORSTOM 14. Mémoires du Muséum national d'Histoire naturelle. Série A, Zoologie. 167: pp. 499–525. (look up in IMIS).

== Distribution ==
This marine species occurs off New Caledonia.
