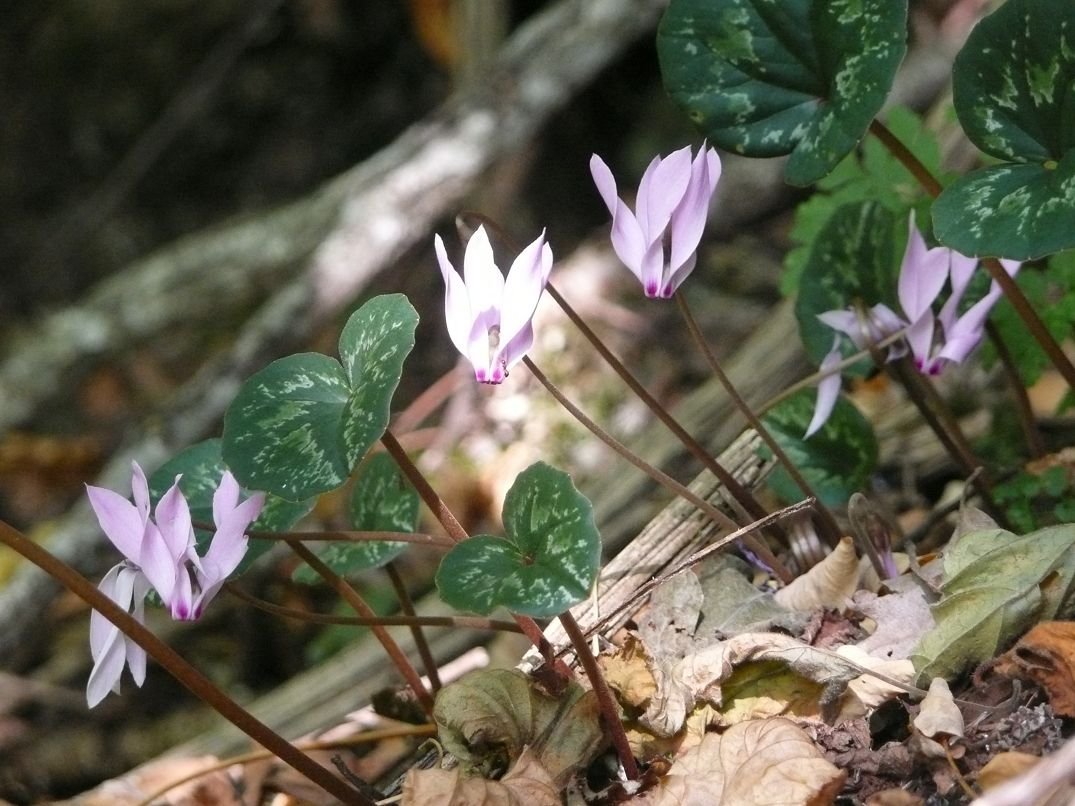

Conservation status
- Near Threatened (IUCN 3.1)

Scientific classification
- Kingdom: Plantae
- Clade: Tracheophytes
- Clade: Angiosperms
- Clade: Eudicots
- Clade: Asterids
- Order: Ericales
- Family: Primulaceae
- Genus: Cyclamen
- Subgenus: C. subg. Gyrophoebe
- Species: C. cilicium

Binomial name
- Cyclamen cilicium Boiss. & Heldr.

Synonyms
- Cyclamen cilicium f. album E.Frank & Koenen

= Cyclamen cilicium =

Species of flowering plant in the primrose family

Cyclamen cilicium is a species of flowering perennial plant in the family Primulaceae. It is native to coniferous woodland at 700–2,000 m (2,300–6,600 ft) elevation in the Taurus Mountains of southern Turkey.

== Etymology ==
The species name cilicium is the adjective of Cilicia, an ancient name of a region of southeast Turkey.

== Description ==
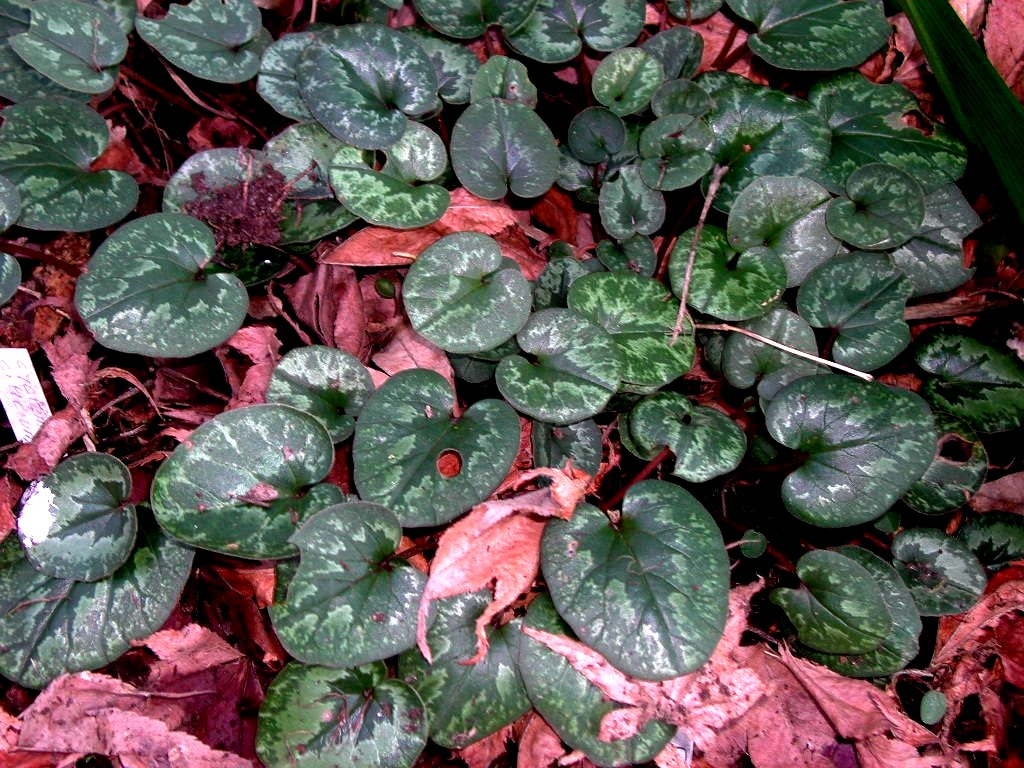
Leaves

The plant grows from a tuber, forming a mound about 10 cm (3.9 in) tall and broad. The leaves are heart-shaped or oval and green, often patterned with silver. The flowers bloom in autumn (fall) and have 5 sepals and 5 upswept petals, white to rose-pink with magenta markings on the nose. They are fragrant.

C. cilicium is hardy down to −5 °C (23 °F), so is best grown in a warm or coastal location. Like many hardy cyclamens, it requires sharp drainage and a hot, dry summer. If this cannot be provided, a controlled environment under glass may be preferable. This plant has gained the Royal Horticultural Society's Award of Garden Merit (confirmed 2017).

== Forms ==
Cyclamen cilicium forma album has pure-white petals.

Cyclamen intaminatum was formerly known as Cyclamen cilicium var. intaminatum.
