= Calliotectum smithi =

Scientific classification
- Kingdom: Animalia
- Phylum: Mollusca
- Class: Gastropoda
- Subclass: Caenogastropoda
- Order: Neogastropoda
- Family: Volutidae
- Genus: Calliotectum
- Species: C. smithi

Binomial name
- Calliotectum smithi (Bartsch, 1942)

Species of gastropod

Calliotectum smithi is a species of sea snail, a marine gastropod mollusk in the family Volutidae, the volutes.

== Description ==
This tall-spired species attains a size of 160 mm.

== Distribution ==
Type locality: Philippines
