= Taraxacum mirabile =

Scientific classification
- Kingdom: Plantae
- Clade: Tracheophytes
- Clade: Angiosperms
- Clade: Eudicots
- Clade: Asterids
- Order: Asterales
- Family: Asteraceae
- Genus: Taraxacum
- Species: T. mirabile

Binomial name
- Taraxacum mirabile Wagenitz, 1962

Species of flowering plant

Taraxacum mirabile is a type of dandelion that grows between 800 and 1300 meters on salty soils (especially endemic in Lake Tuz) in northern and central Turkey.
