= Speagonum =

Scientific classification
- Domain: Eukaryota
- Kingdom: Animalia
- Phylum: Arthropoda
- Class: Insecta
- Order: Coleoptera
- Suborder: Adephaga
- Family: Carabidae
- Subfamily: Platyninae
- Tribe: Platynini
- Subtribe: Platynina
- Genus: Speagonum; B.Moore, 1977
- Species: S. mirabile

Binomial name
- Speagonum mirabile B.Moore, 1977

Genus of beetles

Speagonum is a genus of ground beetles in the family Carabidae. This genus has a single species, Speagonum mirabile. It is found on New Guinea.
