= Calliotectum mirabile =

Scientific classification
- Kingdom: Animalia
- Phylum: Mollusca
- Class: Gastropoda
- Subclass: Caenogastropoda
- Order: Neogastropoda
- Family: Volutidae
- Genus: Calliotectum
- Species: C. mirabile

Binomial name
- Calliotectum mirabile (Clench & Aguayo, 1941)

Species of gastropod

Calliotectum mirabile is a species of sea snail, a marine gastropod mollusk in the family Volutidae, the volutes.
