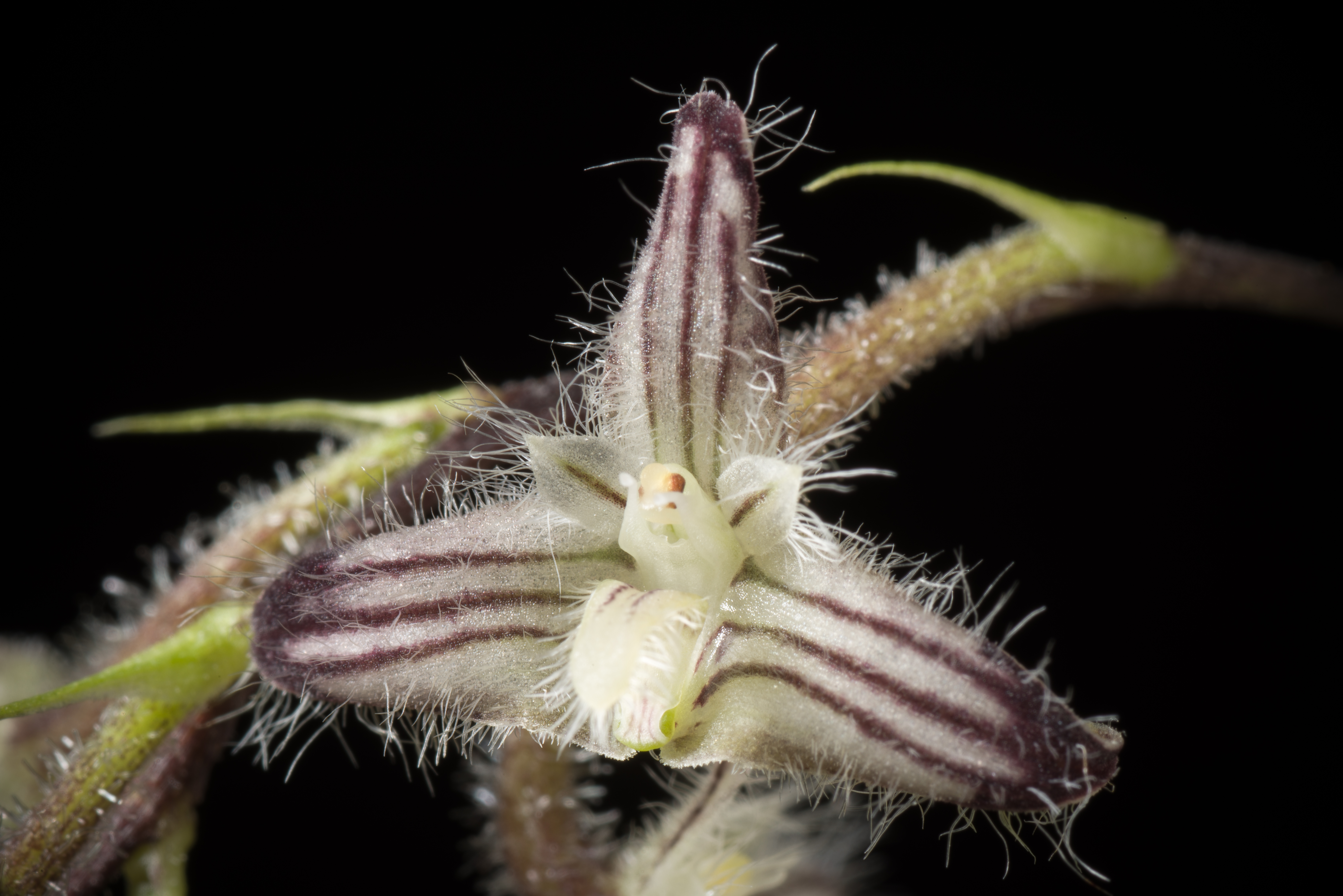

Scientific classification
- Kingdom: Plantae
- Clade: Tracheophytes
- Clade: Angiosperms
- Clade: Monocots
- Order: Asparagales
- Family: Orchidaceae
- Subfamily: Epidendroideae
- Genus: Bulbophyllum
- Species: B. lindleyanum

Binomial name
- Bulbophyllum lindleyanum Griff.

Synonyms
- Phyllorkis lindleyana (Griff.) Kuntze; Bulbophyllum caesariatum Ridl.; Bulbophyllum rigens Rchb.f.

= Bulbophyllum lindleyanum =

Species of orchid

Bulbophyllum lindleyanum is a species of flowering plant in the family Orchidaceae.
