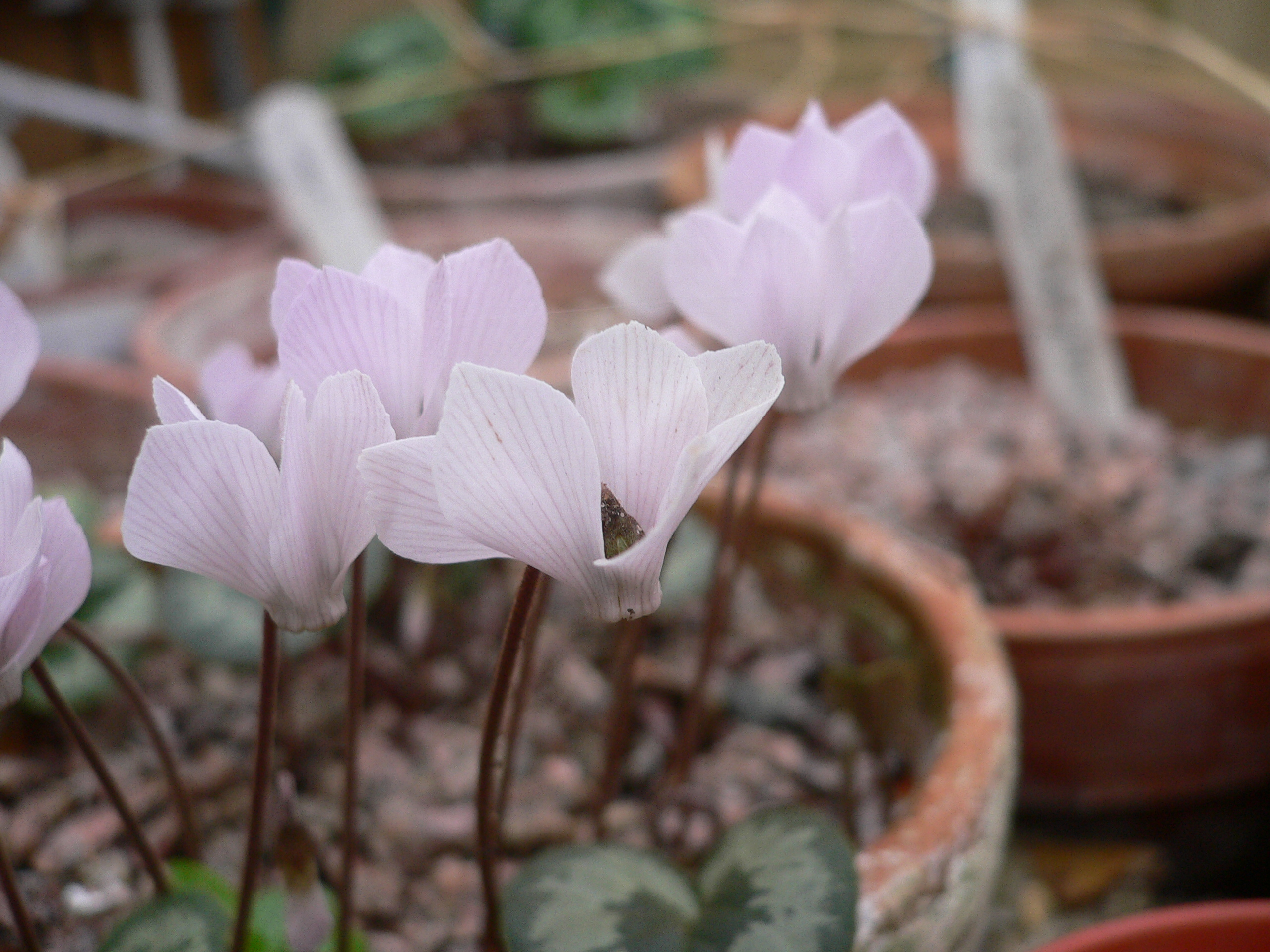

Conservation status
- Near Threatened (IUCN 3.1)

Scientific classification
- Kingdom: Plantae
- Clade: Embryophytes
- Clade: Tracheophytes
- Clade: Angiosperms
- Clade: Eudicots
- Clade: Asterids
- Order: Ericales
- Family: Primulaceae
- Genus: Cyclamen
- Subgenus: C. subg. Gyrophoebe
- Species: C. intaminatum

Binomial name
- Cyclamen intaminatum (Meikle) Grey-Wilson

Synonyms
- Homotypic Synonyms: Cyclamen cilicium subsp. intaminatum (Meikle) Ietsw.; Cyclamen cilicium var. intaminatum Meikle

= Cyclamen intaminatum =

Species of flowering plant

Cyclamen intaminatum is a species of perennial flowering plant in the family Primulaceae. It is native to oak woodland in scattered spots at 100–1,100 m (330–3,610 ft) in western Turkey. It is similar to Cyclamen cilicium, but smaller.

== Etymology ==
The species is named intāminātum "undefiled", from the stem of contāmen (= -tagmen) "pollution", from tangō "I touch", because of the unmarked petals.

== Description ==
It grows from a tuber with leaves that are almost round and dark green variegated with silver. Its Flowers are white to light pink, with no spot of darker color on the nose as in many other cyclamens.
