= Bulbophyllum sect. Codonosiphon =

- Bulbophyllum callipes

Scientific classification
- Kingdom: Plantae
- Clade: Tracheophytes
- Clade: Angiosperms
- Clade: Monocots
- Order: Asparagales
- Family: Orchidaceae
- Subfamily: Epidendroideae
- Genus: Bulbophyllum
- Section: Bulbophyllum sect. Codonosiphon; Schltr. 1913

Type species
- Bulbophyllum codonanthum

Species
- See text

Synonyms
- Codonosiphon Schltr. 1913; Hapalochilus (Schltr.) Senghas 1978; Saccoglossum Schltr. 1913; Bulbophyllum subg. Hapalochilus Schltr.1912; Bulbophyllum sect. Coelochilus Schltr. 1912; Bulbophyllum sect. Scyphochilus Schltr. 1912; Bulbophyllum sect. Trachychilus Schltr. 1912; Codonosiphon Schltr. 1913; Hapalochilus (Schltr.) Senghas 1978; Saccoglossum Schltr. 1913

Section of flowering plants

Bulbophyllum sect. Codonosiphon is a section of the genus Bulbophyllum.

== Description ==
Species in this section have flower column and lip are fused.

== Distribution ==
Plants from this section are found from Borneo, New Guinea, Sulawesi, the Moluccas, and the Mariana Islands.

== Species ==
Bulbophyllum section Codonosiphon comprises the following species:

Image	Name	Distribution	Elevation (m)
	Bulbophyllum acanthoglossum Schltr. 1913	New Guinea	250–800 metres (820–2,620 ft)
	Bulbophyllum alkmaarense J.J.Sm. 1911	New Guinea	1,500–2,500 metres (4,900–8,200 ft)
	Bulbophyllum alticola Schltr. 1912	New Guinea	2,400–3,100 metres (7,900–10,200 ft)
	Bulbophyllum arcaniflorum Ridl. 1916	western New Guinea	750 metres (2,460 ft)
	Bulbophyllum arfakense J.J.Sm. 1917	western New Guinea	2,000–2,100 metres (6,600–6,900 ft)
	Bulbophyllum aristilabre J.J.Sm. 1912	New Guinea	300 metres (980 ft)
	Bulbophyllum arminii Sieder & Kiehn 2009	New Guinea	950 metres (3,120 ft)
	Bulbophyllum ascochilum J.J.Verm. 2008	Papua New Guinea	
	Bulbophyllum aureoapex Schltr. 1913	New Guinea	100 metres (330 ft)
	Bulbophyllum biserratum J.J.Verm. 2008	Papua New Guinea	25 metres (82 ft)
	Bulbophyllum breve Schltr. 1913	New Guinea	300 metres (980 ft)
	Bulbophyllum bulhartii Sieder & Kiehn 2009	New Guinea	800 metres (2,600 ft)
	Bulbophyllum callipes J.J.Sm. 1908	New Guinea	500 metres (1,600 ft)
	Bulbophyllum campanuliflorum J.J.Verm., Schuit. & de Vogel 2014	New Guinea	1,000 metres (3,300 ft)
	Bulbophyllum caudipetalum J.J.Sm. 1913	western New Guinea	500 metres (1,600 ft)
	Bulbophyllum chrysochilum Schltr. 1912	New Guinea	1,000 metres (3,300 ft)
	Bulbophyllum chrysoglossum Schltr. 1905	New Guinea	600–1,000 metres (2,000–3,300 ft)
	Bulbophyllum codonanthum Schltr. 1911	Sulawesi and New Guinea	1,000–1,200 metres (3,300–3,900 ft)
	Bulbophyllum collinum Schltr. 1913	New Guinea	400–900 metres (1,300–3,000 ft)
	Bulbophyllum coloratum J.J.Sm. 1910	New Guinea	500 metres (1,600 ft)
	Bulbophyllum concolor J.J.Sm. 1914	western New Guinea	350–500 metres (1,150–1,640 ft)
	Bulbophyllum cruciatum J.J.Sm. 1911	New Guinea, Seram Island, and Maluku Islands	5–1,100 metres (16–3,609 ft)
	Bulbophyllum cuniculiforme J.J.Sm. 1911	New Guinea	800 metres (2,600 ft)
	Bulbophyllum cyrtophyllum J.J.Verm. 2008	Papua New Guinea	1,760 metres (5,770 ft)
	Bulbophyllum decurvulum Schltr. 1912	New Guinea	800 metres (2,600 ft)
	Bulbophyllum dolichoglottis Schltr.1912	New Guinea	700 metres (2,300 ft)
	Bulbophyllum fasciatum Schltr. 1912	New Guinea	600 metres (2,000 ft)
	Bulbophyllum fibrinum J.J.Sm. 1913	Papua New Guinea	350–500 metres (1,150–1,640 ft)
	Bulbophyllum formosum Schltr. 1912	New Guinea	800 metres (2,600 ft)
	Bulbophyllum frustrans J.J.Sm.1911	New Guinea	1,800–2,000 metres (5,900–6,600 ft)
	Bulbophyllum geniculiferum J.J.Sm. 1912	New Guinea	300 metres (980 ft)
	Bulbophyllum gobiense Schltr. 1912	New Guinea	350 metres (1,150 ft)
	Bulbophyllum gadsupiorum Cavestro & K.Metzg. 2023	Papua New Guinea	1,800 metres (5,900 ft)
	Bulbophyllum holochilum J.J.Sm. 1912	Papua New Guinea	25–800 metres (82–2,625 ft)
	Bulbophyllum humile Schltr. 1913	New Guinea	800 metres (2,600 ft)
	Bulbophyllum immobile Schlechter 1913	Papua New Guinea	200 metres (660 ft)
	Bulbophyllum inclinatum J.J.Sm. 1935	western New Guinea	250 metres (820 ft)
	Bulbophyllum jadunae Schltr. 1912	eastern New Guinea	300 metres (980 ft)
	Bulbophyllum johannae Cavestro & K.Metzg. 2024	Papua New Guinea	1,700 metres (5,600 ft)
	Bulbophyllum kelelense Schltr. 1913	New Guinea	200 metres (660 ft)
	Bulbophyllum kusaiense Tuyama 1940	Caroline Islands (Kosrae)	500 metres (1,600 ft)
	Bulbophyllum leontoglossum Schltr. 1913	New Guinea	150 metres (490 ft)
	Bulbophyllum leucoglossum Schuit., Juswara & Droissart 2016	New Guinea	1,005 metres (3,297 ft)
	Bulbophyllum lohokii J.J.Verm. & A.L.Lamb 1994	Borneo	1,600–2,300 metres (5,200–7,500 ft)
	Bulbophyllum longilabre Schltr. 1912	Papua New Guinea	700–1,000 metres (2,300–3,300 ft)
	Bulbophyllum maculiflorum J.J.Verm., Schuit. & de Vogel 2015	New Guinea	1,100 metres (3,600 ft)
	Bulbophyllum melinoglossum Schltr. 1913	New Guinea	1,200 metres (3,900 ft)
	Bulbophyllum microrhombos Schltr. 1912	New Guinea, the Solomon Islands and Vanuatu	500–1,200 metres (1,600–3,900 ft)
	Bulbophyllum monosema Schltr. 1913	New Guinea	1,100 metres (3,600 ft)
	Bulbophyllum mystax Schuit. & de Vogel 2002	Papua New Guinea	450–600 metres (1,480–1,970 ft)
	Bulbophyllum mystrochilum Schltr. 1913	New Guinea	1,100 metres (3,600 ft)
	Bulbophyllum neoebudicum (Garay, Hamer & Siegerist) Sieder & Kiehn 2009	Vanuatu	1,000 metres (3,300 ft)
	Bulbophyllum nitidum Schltr. 1912	Papua New Guinea	1,200 metres (3,900 ft)
	Bulbophyllum novae-hiberniae Schltr. 1905	Bismark archipelago and the Solomon Islands	600 metres (2,000 ft)
	Bulbophyllum olorinum J.J.Sm.1912	New Guinea	25–225 metres (82–738 ft)
	Bulbophyllum oxyanthum Schltr. 1905	New Guinea	500 metres (1,600 ft)
	Bulbophyllum pemae Schltr. 1913	New Guinea	400 metres (1,300 ft)
	Bulbophyllum pendens J.J.Verm. 2008	western New Guinea	600 metres (2,000 ft)
	Bulbophyllum plagiatum Ridl. 1916	western New Guinea	1,033 metres (3,389 ft)
	Bulbophyllum pyroglossum Schuit. & de Vogel 2005	Papua New Guinea	250 metres (820 ft)
	Bulbophyllum quadricaudatum J.J.Sm. 1911	Papua New Guinea	75 metres (246 ft)
	Bulbophyllum ramulicola Schuit. & de Vogel 2002	western New Guinea	550 metres (1,800 ft)
	Bulbophyllum raulersoniae Deloso, Paulino & Cootes 2022	Guam and Rota	140–350 metres (460–1,150 ft)
	Bulbophyllum rectilabre J.J.Sm. 1912	western New Guinea	350–750 metres (1,150–2,460 ft)
	Bulbophyllum saccoglossum J.J.Verm., Schuit. & de Vogel 2014	Papua New Guinea	1,000–2,300 metres (3,300–7,500 ft)
	Bulbophyllum scaphioglossum J.J.Verm. & Rysy 2014	western New Guinea	
	Bulbophyllum scaphosepalum Ridl. 1916	western New Guinea	
	Bulbophyllum schizopetalum L.O.Williams 1946	New Guinea	1,700 metres (5,600 ft)
	Bulbophyllum scyphochilus Schltr. 1912	New Guinea	150–800 metres (490–2,620 ft)
	Bulbophyllum smileiphyllum J.J.Verm., Schuit. & de Vogel 2014	New Guinea	
	Bulbophyllum speciosum Schltr. 1912	Papua New Guinea	600–1,200 metres (2,000–3,900 ft)
	Bulbophyllum stabile J.J.Sm. 1911	Papua New Guinea	
	Bulbophyllum stalagmotelos J.J.Verm. 2008	Papua New Guinea	
	Bulbophyllum stellula Ridl. 1916	western New Guinea	759 metres (2,490 ft)
	Bulbophyllum stenophyton (Garay & W.Kittr.) Schuit & de Vogel 2011	Papua New Guinea, Solomon Islands, orn Islands and Vanuatu	800–900 metres (2,600–3,000 ft)
	Bulbophyllum stictanthum Schltr. 1913	New Guinea	1,200 metres (3,900 ft)
	Bulbophyllum takeuchii (Howcroft) J.J.Verm., Schuit. & de Vogel 2014	Bismark Archipelago	
	Bulbophyllum torricellense Schltr. 1913	New Guinea	800 metres (2,600 ft)
	Bulbophyllum trachyglossum Schltr. 1905	Bismark Archipelago and Solomon Islands	600 metres (2,000 ft)
	Bulbophyllum trichromum Schltr. 1923	Papua New Guinea	1,000 metres (3,300 ft)
	Bulbophyllum trigonocarpum Schltr. 1905	New Guinea	800 metres (2,600 ft)
	Bulbophyllum verrucosum (L.O.Williams) J.J.Verm., Schuit. & de Vogel 2014	New Guinea	1,100–1,800 metres (3,600–5,900 ft)
	Bulbophyllum warianum Schltr. 1913	New Guinea	400 metres (1,300 ft)
	Bulbophyllum wechsbergii Sieder & Kiehn 2009	New Guinea	1,300 metres (4,300 ft)
	Bulbophyllum xanthoacron J.J.Sm. 1911	New Guinea	
	Bulbophyllum xanthophaeum Schltr. 1913	Papua New Guinea	450–1,000 metres (1,480–3,280 ft)
