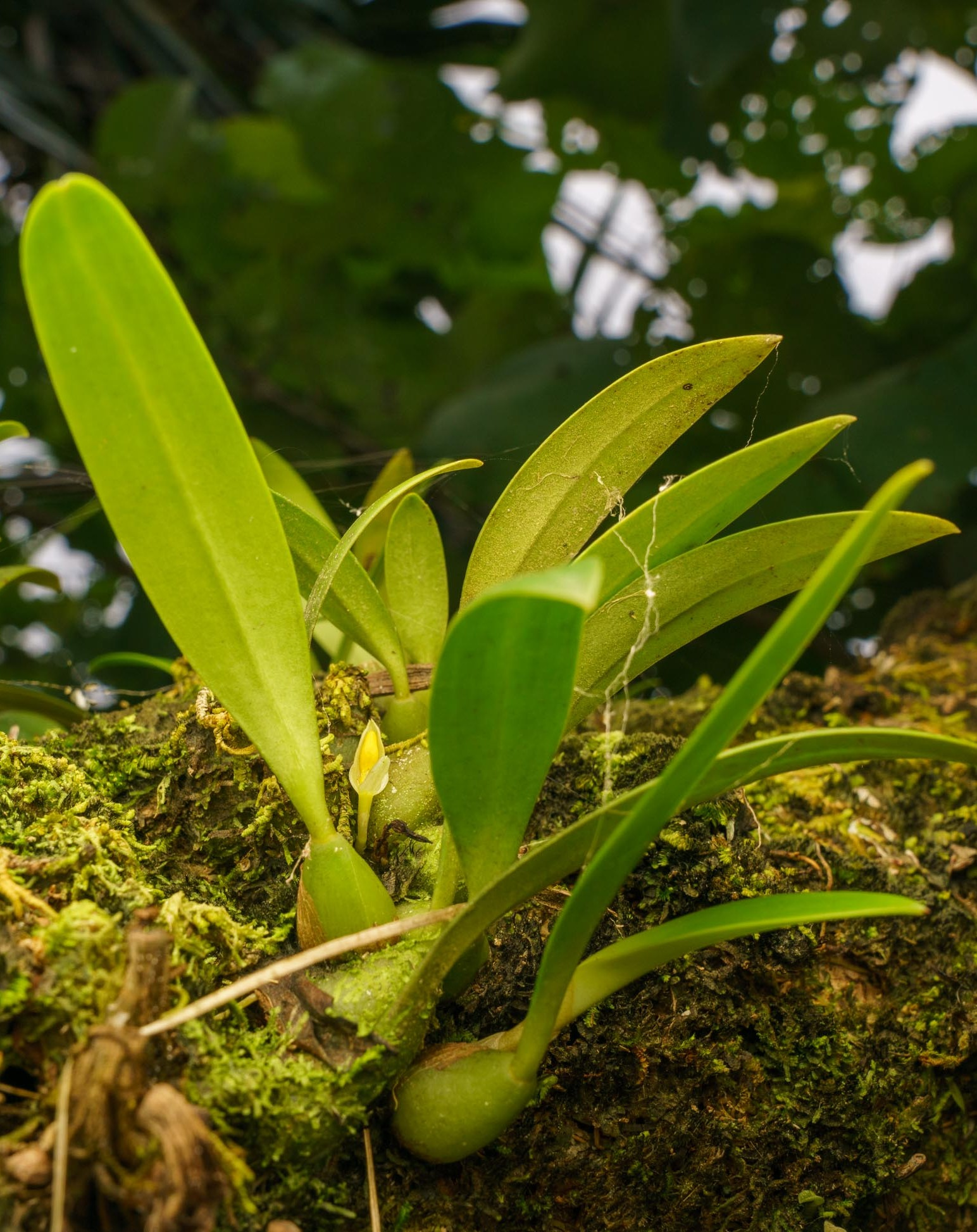

Scientific classification
- Kingdom: Plantae
- Clade: Tracheophytes
- Clade: Angiosperms
- Clade: Monocots
- Order: Asparagales
- Family: Orchidaceae
- Subfamily: Epidendroideae
- Genus: Bulbophyllum
- Section: Bulbophyllum sect. Codonosiphon
- Species: B. raulersoniae

Binomial name
- Bulbophyllum raulersoniae Deloso, Paulino & Cootes

= Bulbophyllum raulersoniae =

Species of flowering plants

Bulbophyllum raulersoniae is a species of orchid in the section Codonosiphon. It is endemic to the islands of Guam and Rota in the Marianas Archipelago. The species was named posthumously after Dr. Lynn Raulerson, professor of biology at the University of Guam, who had discovered the species in 1986. After going unnamed for 36 years, the species was first described and named in the OrchideenJournal in 2022 by Banjamin Deloso, Charles Paulino, and Jim Cootes.

== Distribution ==
The species is only known to occur in moist forests of elevated limestone on the islands of Guam and Rota, where it grows as an epiphyte in the understory. The type specimen was found in northern Guam in Machanao, near Potts Junction at about 140 meters above sea level, growing on Morinda citrifolia. Since then, this habitat has been cleared for development, and there were no observations of the species during a 2016/2017 survey at the nearby Anderson Airforce Base in northern Guam.

In southern Guam, specimens can be seen growing on the elevated limestone caps along the Lamlam-Alifan ridge about 350 meters above sea level.

On the island of Rota, Bulbophyllum raulersoniae has been observed growing at Sabana.

In their 2022 description of the species, Deloso et al. recommended surveys of other Mariana Islands to determine if this diminutive orchid may have a larger native range, as well as further searches to see if it may still persist in northern Guam.

== Description ==
In their original description of the species, Deloso et al. distinguish Bulbophyllum raulersoniae from other Bulbophyllum species by its "smaller pseudobulbs, an abscising lamina that leaves persisting pseudobulbs with a prominent leaf scar, a solitary flower on a short pedicel, and shorter petioles, lateral sepals, and petals."

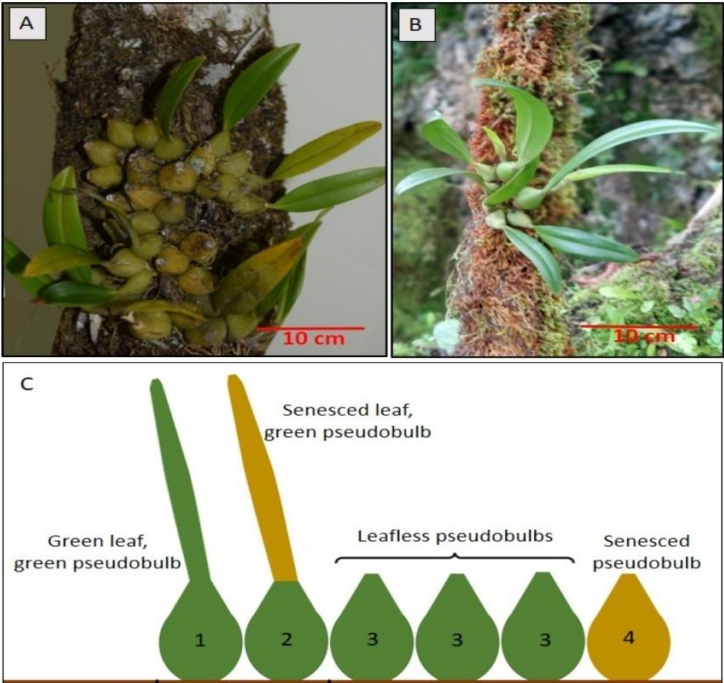
(A) Bulbophyllum raulersoniae. (B) Bulbophyllum guamense. (C) Depiction of four types of leaf and pseudobulb arrangements. From Thomas Marler in "Ephemeral and persistent pseudobulbs differ in their influence on nutrient relations of Guam Bulbophyllum plants," in the journal Species, 2022.

Bulbophyllum raulersoniae is smaller and more delicate than Bulbophyllum gaumense, another Guam and Rota endemic orchid. They particularly differ in flower traits, although the two species have similar-appearing leaves, pseudobulbs and rhizomes. Both species produce one leaf per pseudobulb. The pseudobulbs of Bulbophyllum raulersoniae persist after their associated leaf has fallen off, whereas the pseudobulb and leaf senesce together in Bulbophyllum guamense.

Bulbophyllum raulersoniae blooms several times per year, but the flowers last only 2 days, opening slightly on the afternoon of the first day, fully opening by the next morning, and wilting by the afternoon of the second day.

== Ecology ==
Host plants identified so far include Morinda citrifolia, Areca catechu, Pandanus tectorius, Pandanus dibius, Elaeocarpus joga, Guettarda speciosa, and Freycinecia reineckii.

Although many Orchidaceae species have relationships with specific pollinators, a pollinator for Bulbophyllum raulersoniae has not yet been identified.

== Conservation status ==
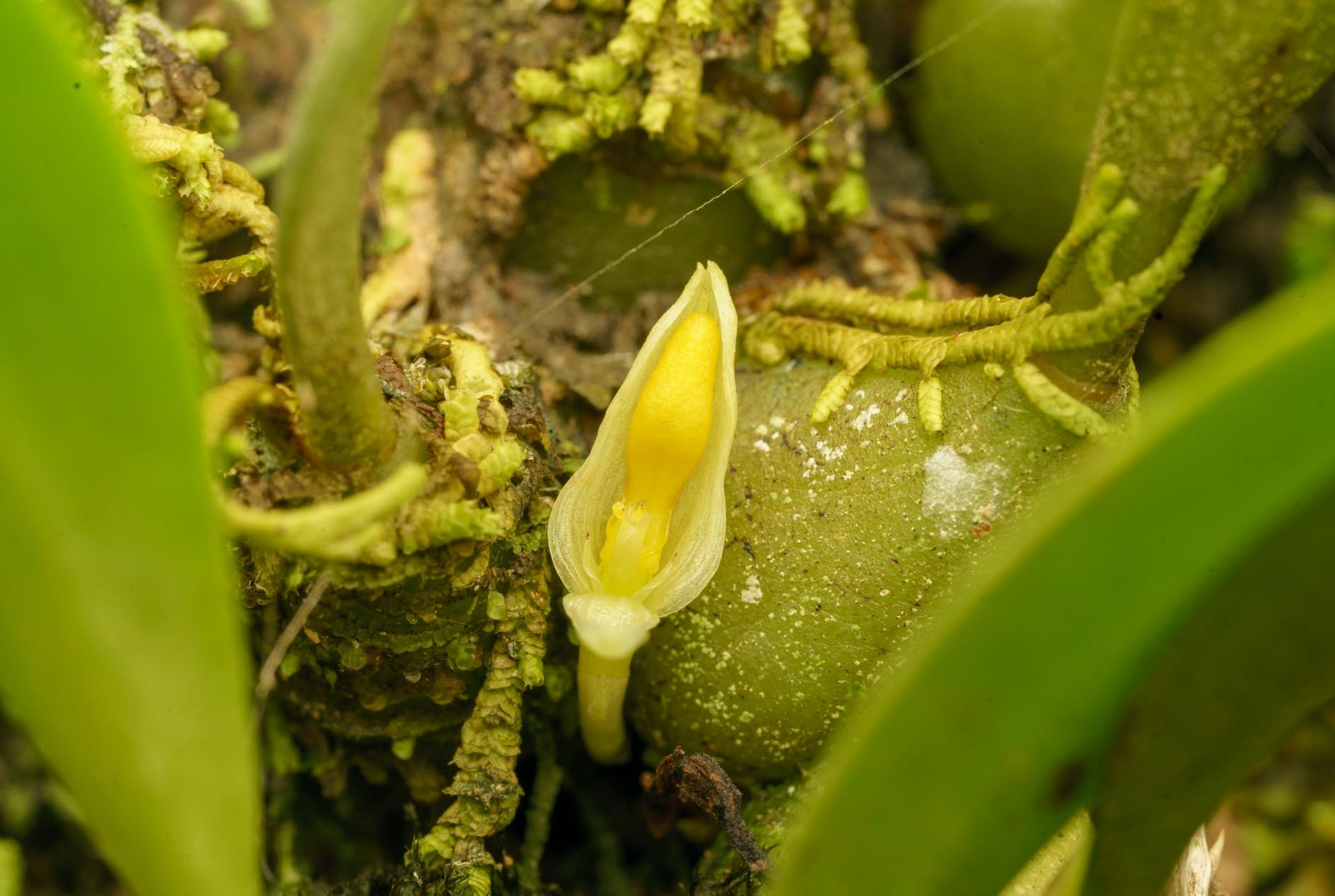
Solitary flower of Bulbophyllum raulersoniae.

Deloso et al. had recommended in 2022 that the species be listed as endangered, citing its restricted habitat on elevated limestone only on the islands of Guam and Rota. As of March 2024, the species is not yet listed by the IUCN.

== See also ==
List of endemic plants in the Mariana Islands
