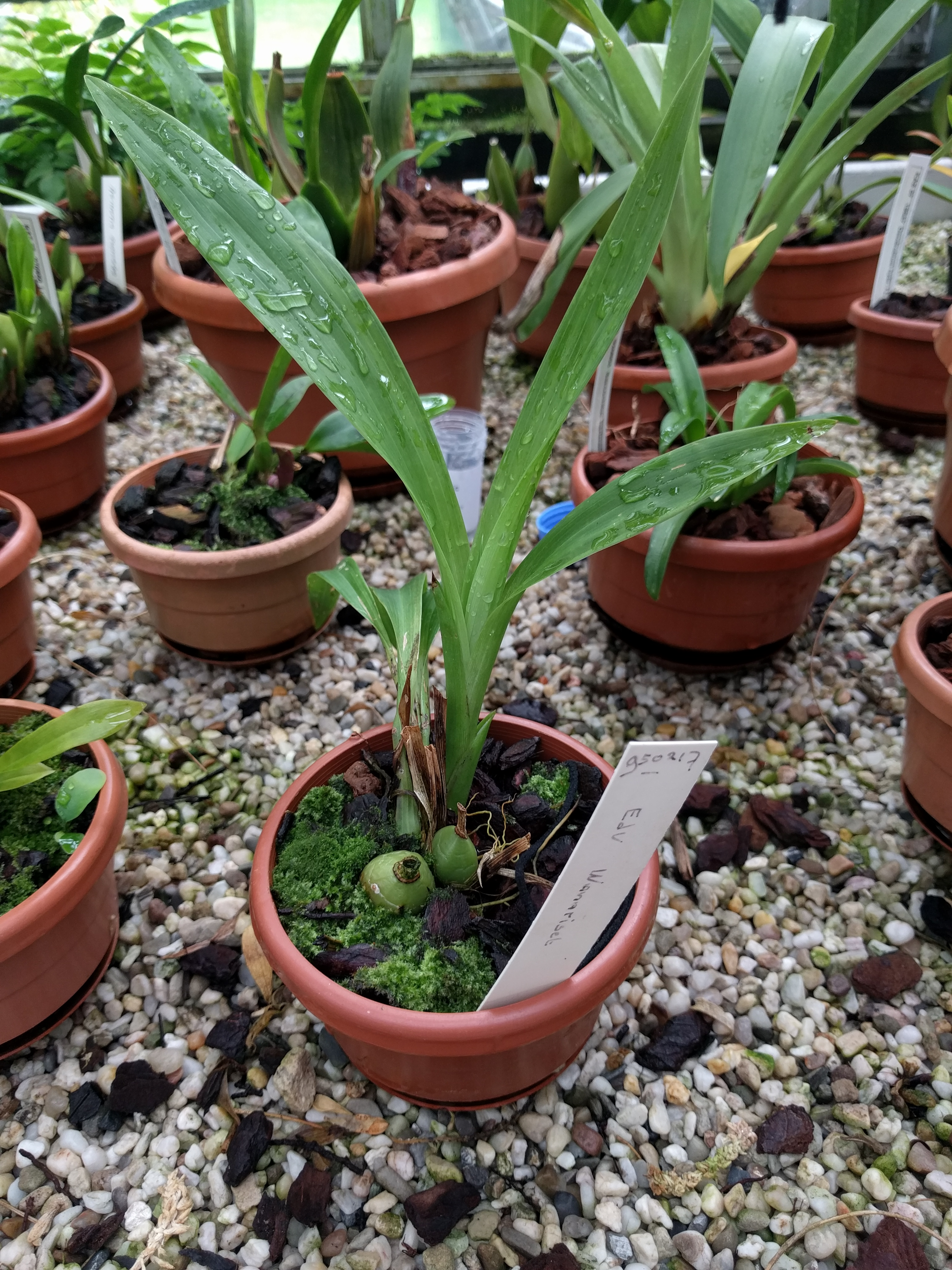

Scientific classification
- Kingdom: Plantae
- Clade: Tracheophytes
- Clade: Angiosperms
- Clade: Monocots
- Order: Asparagales
- Family: Orchidaceae
- Subfamily: Epidendroideae
- Genus: Bulbophyllum
- Species: B. coloratum

Binomial name
- Bulbophyllum coloratum J.J.Sm.

= Bulbophyllum coloratum =

Species of orchid

Bulbophyllum coloratum (colored bulbophyllum) is a species of orchid in the genus Bulbophyllum. Found in New Guinea in the coastal plains under 500 meters in elevation. It is a small sized leaf that blooms on a single flowered inflorescence.
