= Bulbophyllum dolichoglottis =

Scientific classification
- Kingdom: Plantae
- Clade: Tracheophytes
- Clade: Angiosperms
- Clade: Monocots
- Order: Asparagales
- Family: Orchidaceae
- Subfamily: Epidendroideae
- Genus: Bulbophyllum
- Species: B. dolichoglottis

Binomial name
- Bulbophyllum dolichoglottis Schltr.

Synonyms
- Hapalochilus dolichoglottis

Species of orchid

Bulbophyllum dolichoglottis is a species of orchid in the genus Bulbophyllum, Section Codonosiphon Schlechter 1913. It is found only in New Guinea at approximately 700 meters (2,300 feet). It grows best in intermediate temperatures with high humidity and fairly constant conditions year round.
