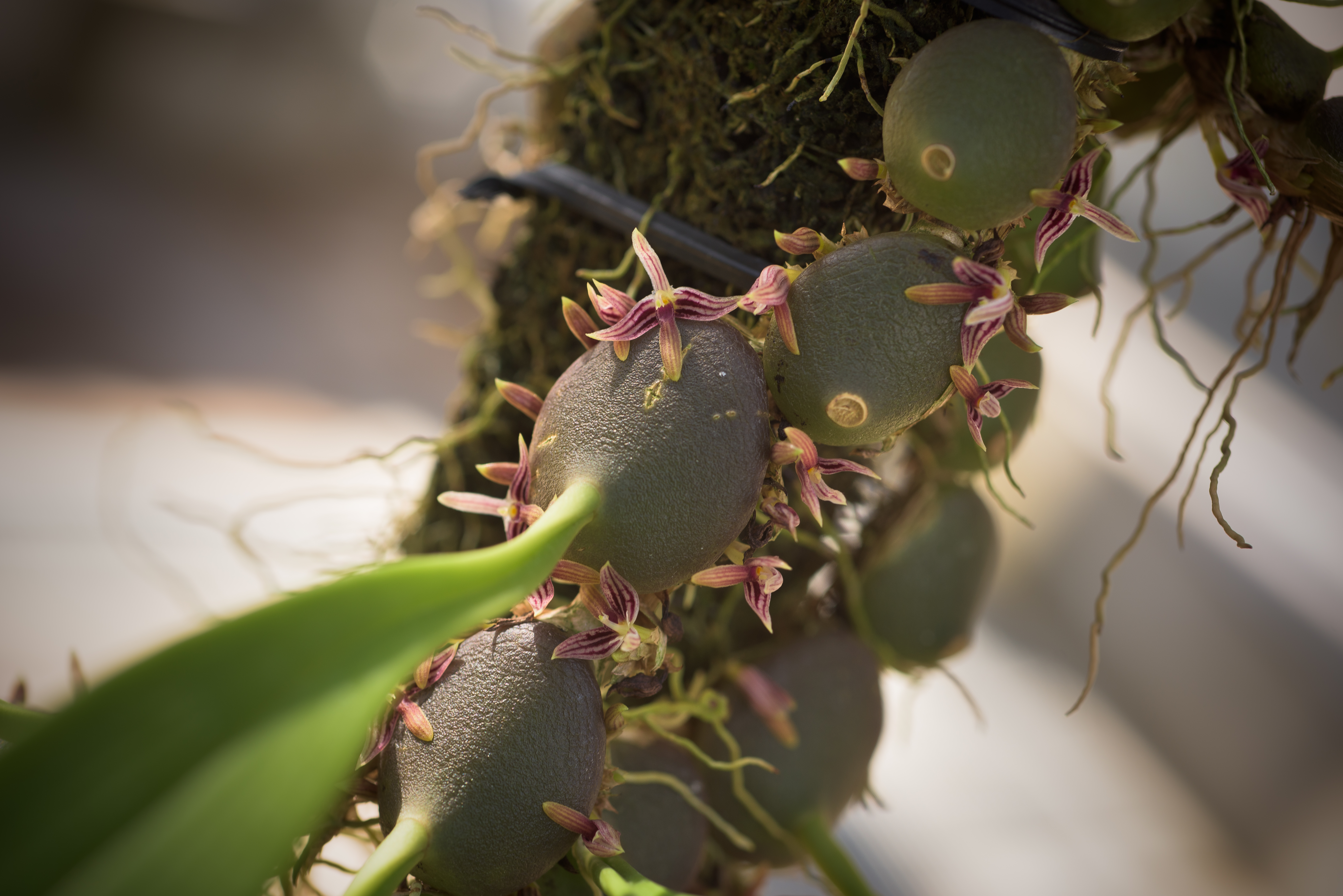

Scientific classification
- Kingdom: Plantae
- Clade: Tracheophytes
- Clade: Angiosperms
- Clade: Monocots
- Order: Asparagales
- Family: Orchidaceae
- Subfamily: Epidendroideae
- Genus: Bulbophyllum
- Species: B. cruciatum

Binomial name
- Bulbophyllum cruciatum J.J.Sm. 1911

Synonyms
- Hapalochilus cruciatus (J.J.Sm.) Garay & W.Kittr. 1985 publ. 1986; Bulbophyllum immobile Schltr. 1913; Bulbophyllum mutatum J.J.Sm. 1916; Hapalochilus immobilis (Schltr.) Garay, Hamer & Siegerist 1995; Hapalochilus mutatus (J.J.Sm.) Garay & W.Kittr. 1985 publ. 1986

= Bulbophyllum cruciatum =

Species of orchid

Bulbophyllum cruciatum is a species of orchid in the genus Bulbophyllum found in Papua, Papua New Guinea, Seram Island, and Maluku Islands.

== Description ==
Plants are epiphytes with creeping rhizomes. Pseudobulbs grow close together and are obtuse and conically depressed, green to dark purple and 1.25-1.5 × 1.9-2.4 cm with a single leaf. Leaves are lanceolate, obtuse, apiculate, and 11 × 2.8-3.6 cm. The plant blooms from the base of the pseudobulb on a 0.4 cm long peduncle with a single purple and white flower. The flower is crossed shape 1.8 × 1.5 cm. The dorsal sepal is erect, lanceolate 0.83 × 0.24 cm. The lateral sepals are slightly de-flexed, obliquely oblong-ovate and 0.85 × 0.4 cm. The petals are small, ovate-lanceolate, and 0.2 cm long.

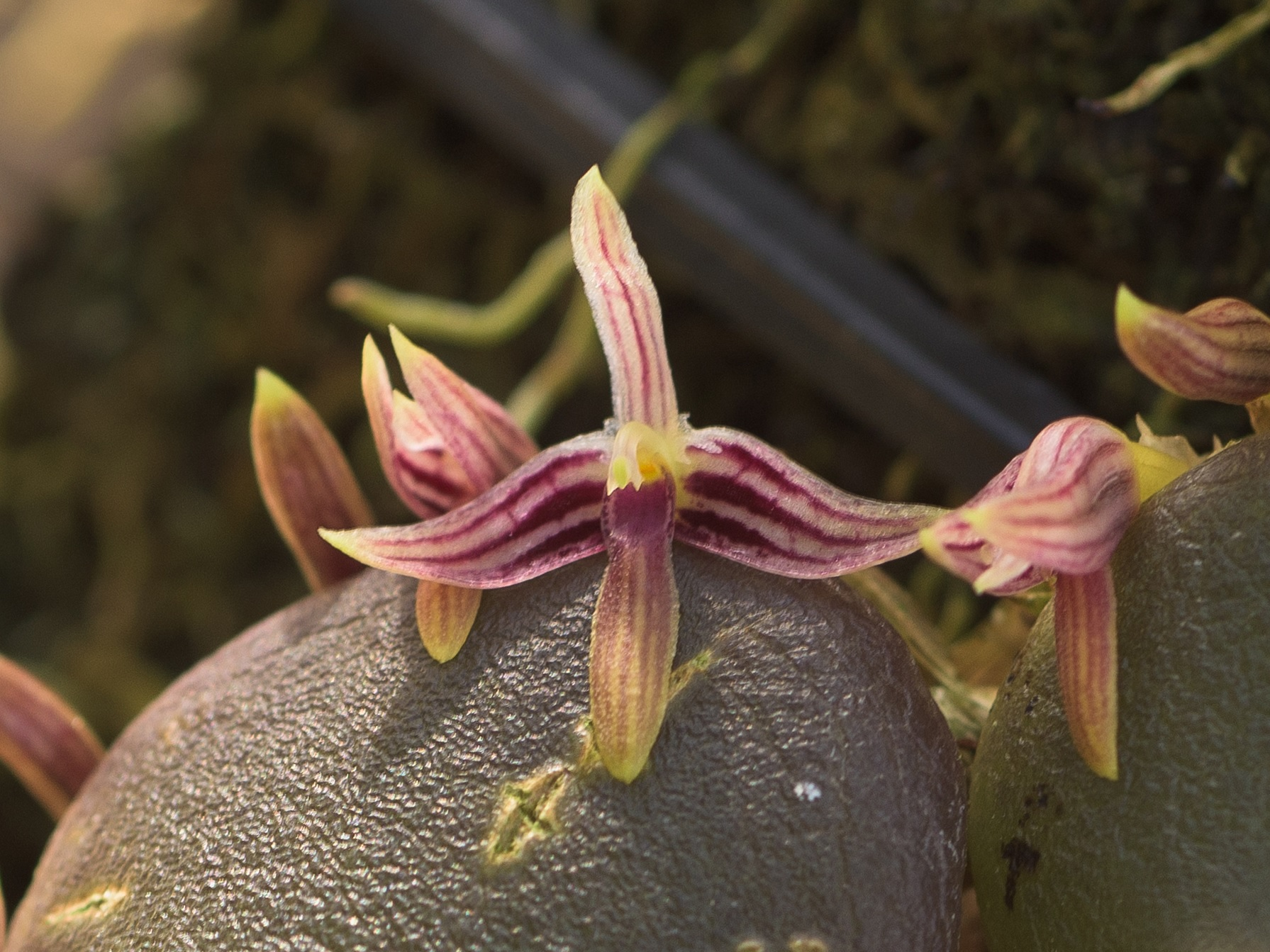
Flower

== Distribution ==
Plants are found growing in the warm lowland forest of New Guinea at elevations between 5–1100 meters.
