= Bulbophyllum stenophyton =

Scientific classification
- Kingdom: Plantae
- Clade: Tracheophytes
- Clade: Angiosperms
- Clade: Monocots
- Order: Asparagales
- Family: Orchidaceae
- Subfamily: Epidendroideae
- Genus: Bulbophyllum
- Species: B. stenophyton

Binomial name
- Bulbophyllum stenophyton (Garay & W.Kittr.) Schuit. & de Vogel

Synonyms
- Bulbophyllum hornense Govaerts; Bulbophyllum stenophyllum Schltr.; Hapalochilus stenophyton Garay & W.Kittr.

Species of orchid

Bulbophyllum stenophyton is a species of flowering plant in the family Orchidaceae.
