= Bulbophyllum kusaiense =

Scientific classification
- Kingdom: Plantae
- Clade: Tracheophytes
- Clade: Angiosperms
- Clade: Monocots
- Order: Asparagales
- Family: Orchidaceae
- Subfamily: Epidendroideae
- Genus: Bulbophyllum
- Species: B. kusaiense

Binomial name
- Bulbophyllum kusaiense Tuyama 1940

Species of orchid

Bulbophyllum kusaiense is a species of orchid in the genus Bulbophyllum from the Caroline Islands at elevations around 500 meters.
