= Bulbophyllum sect. Desmosanthes =

- Bulbophyllum laxiflorum var. majus

Scientific classification
- Kingdom: Plantae
- Clade: Tracheophytes
- Clade: Angiosperms
- Clade: Monocots
- Order: Asparagales
- Family: Orchidaceae
- Subfamily: Epidendroideae
- Genus: Bulbophyllum
- Section: Bulbophyllum sect. Desmosanthes; J.J. Sm. 1825

Type species
- Bulbophyllum croceum

Species
- See text

Synonyms
- Diphyes sect Corymbosae Blume 1825; Bulbophyllum sect. Corymbosa [Bl] Avery. 1994

Section of flowering plants

Bulbophyllum sect. Desmosanthes is a section of the genus Bulbophyllum.

== Description ==
Species in this section have pseudobulbs with 2 to more flowered inflorescence and a very short rachis.

== Distribution ==
Plants from this section are found from India, China, Taiwan, eastward to the Philippines, Sulawesi and the Lesser Sunda Islands.

== Species ==
Bulbophyllum section Desmosanthes comprises the following species:

Image	Name	Distribution	Elevation (m)
	Bulbophyllum angustifolium (Blume) Lindl. 1830	Malaysia, Sumatra, Java	1,100–1,800 metres (3,600–5,900 ft)
	Bulbophyllum ardjunense J.J.Sm. 1927	Java	1,220–2,500 metres (4,000–8,200 ft)
	Bulbophyllum appressicaule Ridl. 1917	Sumatra	2,225 metres (7,300 ft)
	Bulbophyllum arrectum Kraenzl. 1921	The Philippines	
	Bulbophyllum astelidum Aver. 1994	Vietnam	
	Bulbophyllum basiflorum M.K.Li, J.P Deng & Y.Luo 2023	China (Xizang)	1,159 metres (3,802 ft)
	Bulbophyllum boulbetii Tixier 1966	Vietnam	600 metres (2,000 ft)
	Bulbophyllum brevipes Ridl.1903	Malaysia	1,300 metres (4,300 ft)
	Bulbophyllum capitatum (Blume) Lindl. 1830	Java	1,000–1,800 metres (3,300–5,900 ft)
	Bulbophyllum caudatum Lindley 1829	northeastern India, Nepal and Sikkim	500–2,000 metres (1,600–6,600 ft)
	Bulbophyllum cauliflorum Hook.f. 1890	eastern Himalayas, Sikkim and Assam	600–2,000 metres (2,000–6,600 ft)
	Bulbophyllum cephalophorum Garay, Hamer and Siegrist 1996	the Philippines (Luzon)	1,200 metres (3,900 ft)
	Bulbophyllum chrysendetum Ames 1915	the Philippines	600 metres (2,000 ft)
	Bulbophyllum chrysocephalum Schltr. 1911	Malesia	
	Bulbophyllum compressum Teijsm. & Binn.1862	Sumatra, Java, Borneo and Sulawesi	100–600 metres (330–1,970 ft)
	Bulbophyllum concinnum Hook.f. 1890	Philippines, Thailand, Vietnam, Malaysia, Borneo, India and Singapore	0–1,280 metres (0–4,199 ft)
	Bulbophyllum corallinum Tixier & Guillaumin 1963	China (Yunnan), Vietnam and Thailand	1,100–1,600 metres (3,600–5,200 ft)
	Bulbophyllum croceum Lindl. 1830	Java, Sumatra	1,350–2,000 metres (4,430–6,560 ft)
	Bulbophyllum cylindricum King & Pantl. 1895 publ. 1896	Sikkim	914.4 metres (3,000 ft)
	Bulbophyllum deergongense J.L.Miao & J.W.Zhai 2023	China (Xizang)	
	Bulbophyllum dempoense J.J.Sm. 1920	Sumatra	1,800 metres (5,900 ft)
	Bulbophyllum diplantherum Carr 1932	Peninsular Malaysia	
	Bulbophyllum dulongjiangense X.H.Jin 2006	China (Yunnan)	
	Bulbophyllum echinulus Seidenf. 1982	China (Yunnan) and Thailand	1,300 metres (4,300 ft)
	Bulbophyllum evrardii Gagnep. 1930	Vietnam and Cambodia	
	Bulbophyllum flammuliferum Ridl. 1898	Peninsular Malaysia and Borneo	520–600 metres (1,710–1,970 ft)
	Bulbophyllum flavidiflorum Carr 1933	Sumatra to Java	800–2,100 metres (2,600–6,900 ft)
	Bulbophyllum gamblei Hook. f. 1912	eastern Himalayas, Bhutan, Sikkim and Assam India	1,800–2,800 metres (5,900–9,200 ft)
	Bulbophyllum globulus Hook.f. 1890	peninsular Malaysia	
	Bulbophyllum gyrochilum Seidenf. 1979	China, Assam and Thailand	1,300 metres (4,300 ft)
	Bulbophyllum igneoconstellatum Cootes, Cabactulan, R.B.Pimentel & M.Leon 2020	Philippines (Mindanao)	1,000–1,300 metres (3,300–4,300 ft)
	Bulbophyllum igneum J.J.Sm. 1913	Java	
	Bulbophyllum inacootesiae Cootes, M.Leon & Naive 2016	Philippines (Mindanao)	1,300 metres (4,300 ft)
	Bulbophyllum jonpetri J.J.Verm. & A.L.Lamb 2013	Borneo	600–1,400 metres (2,000–4,600 ft)
	Bulbophyllum kirroanthum Schltr. 1911	Sumatra	850 metres (2,790 ft)
	Bulbophyllum kwangtungense Schltr.1924	China (Guangdong)	500–1,200 metres (1,600–3,900 ft)
	Bulbophyllum laetum J.J.Verm. 1996	Borneo	1,000 metres (3,300 ft)
	Bulbophyllum laxiflorum [Bl.] Lindl. 1830	Thailand, Myanmar, Laos, Cambodia, Vietnam, Malaysia, Indonesia, Borneo, Sulawesi, Sumatra, Java and the Philippines	100–1,800 metres (330–5,910 ft)
	Bulbophyllum ledungense Tang & F.T.Wang 1974	China (Hainan)	
	Bulbophyllum leptanthum Hook.f. 1890	Assam and the eastern Himalayas	900–1,500 metres (3,000–4,900 ft)
	Bulbophyllum linzhiense Liang Ma & S.P. Chen 2020	China (Xizang)	2,039 metres (6,690 ft)
	Bulbophyllum lombokense Rysy 2014	Lesser Sunda Islands	
	Bulbophyllum longerepens Ridl. 1908	Nicobar Islands, peninsular Malaysia, Java, Sumatra and Borneo	400–1,000 metres (1,300–3,300 ft)
	Bulbophyllum longivagans Carr 1933	Sumatra	1,500 metres (4,900 ft)
	Bulbophyllum medusae (Lindl.) Rchb.f 1861	Sumatra, Java, Borneo and Sulawesi	0–400 metres (0–1,312 ft)
	Bulbophyllum obtusum (Blume) Lindl.1830	Malaysia, Borneo, Java and Sumatra	700–2,200 metres (2,300–7,200 ft)
	Bulbophyllum odoratissimum [Sm.]Lindley 1828	Assam, China(Fujian, Guangdong, Guangxi, Sichuan, Xizing and Yunnan), India, Nepal, Bhutan, Sikkim, Myanmar, Thailand, Laos, Vietnam and China	800–2,500 metres (2,600–8,200 ft)
	Bulbophyllum oligoglossum Rchb.f. 1865	Myanmar	
	Bulbophyllum ovatolanceatum J.J. Sm. 1928	western Sumatra	1,900 metres (6,200 ft)
	Bulbophyllum ovatum Seidenf. 1979	Thailand	
	Bulbophyllum pinicolum Gagnep 1930	Vietnam & Cambodia	1,200–2,400 metres (3,900–7,900 ft)
	Bulbophyllum pleurothallidanthum Garay 1999	Sumatra	
	Bulbophyllum polyrrhizum Lindl. 1830	western Himalayas, Assam, eastern Himalayas, Nepal, Sikkim, India, Myanmar, China (Yunnan) and Thailand	300–1,500 metres (980–4,920 ft)
	Bulbophyllum protractum Hook.f. 1890	Assam, Sikkim, Myanmar, Thailand and Vietnam	500–600 metres (1,600–2,000 ft)
	Bulbophyllum raui Arora 1969 publ. 1972	India (Uttar Pradesh)	
	Bulbophyllum reptans (Lindl.) Lindl 1829	China ( Hainan, Guangxi, Yunnan, southeastern Xizang), Sikkim, Bhutan, Assam, Myanmar, Thailand, Laos and Vietnam	1,000–2,800 metres (3,300–9,200 ft)
	Bulbophyllum romburghii J.J.Sm. 1907	Sumatra and Borneo	400–130 metres (1,310–430 ft)
	Bulbophyllum rubrolabellum T.P.Lin 1975	Taiwan	700–1,700 metres (2,300–5,600 ft)
	Bulbophyllum semiteretifolium Gagnep. 1930	Vietnam	2,000 metres (6,600 ft)
	Bulbophyllum shweliense W.W. Sm. 1921	eastern Himalayas, Bhutan, China (Yunnan), Vietnam and Thailand	500–2,500 metres (1,600–8,200 ft)
	Bulbophyllum sikapingense J.J.Sm. 1920	Sumatra	
	Bulbophyllum simondii Gagnep.1950	Vietnam	
	Bulbophyllum simplex J.J.Verm. & P.O'Byrne 2003	Sulawesi	1,000–2,500 metres (3,300–8,200 ft)
	Bulbophyllum smithianum Schltr. 1911	Sumatra	1,000 metres (3,300 ft)
	Bulbophyllum stellatum Ames 1912	the Philippines	1,650–1,750 metres (5,410–5,740 ft)
	Bulbophyllum stenobulbon Parish & Rchb. f. 1916	Assam India, China, Thailand, Myanmar, Laos and Vietnam	500–800 metres (1,600–2,600 ft)
	Bulbophyllum sulcatum (Blume) Lindl. 1830	Thailand, Malaysia, Vietnam, Java, Lesser Sunda Islands and Sumatra	750–2,000 metres (2,460–6,560 ft)
	Bulbophyllum sutepense (Rolfe ex Downie) Seidenf. & Smitinand 1961	China (Yunnan), Vietnam, Thailand and Laos	600–1,600 metres (2,000–5,200 ft)
	Bulbophyllum talauense (J.J. Sm.) Carr 1932	Peninsular Malaysia	
	Bulbophyllum tengchongense Z.H.Tsi 1989	China (Yunnan)	2,000 metres (6,600 ft)
	Bulbophyllum triflorum (Breda) Blume 1828	Sumatra to western Java	1,650 metres (5,410 ft)
	Bulbophyllum validum Carr 1933	Sumatra	1,524 metres (5,000 ft)
	Bulbophyllum wuzhishanense X.H.Jin 2005	China (Hainan)	1,800 metres (5,900 ft)
	Bulbophyllum xantanthum Schltr. 1911	Sumatra, Java, Bali	800–2,000 metres (2,600–6,600 ft)
	Bulbophyllum ximaense J.D. Ya & Ting Zhang 2021	China (Yunnan)	1,600–1,750 metres (5,250–5,740 ft)
	Bulbophyllum xizangense J.D. Ya & C. Liu 2021	China (Xizang)	1,400–1,650 metres (4,590–5,410 ft)
	Bulbophyllum yarlungzangboense Jian W.Li, Xi L.Wang & X.H.Jin 2019	China (Xizang)	1,700–2,100 metres (5,600–6,900 ft)
