= Bulbophyllum rubrolabellum =

Conservation status
- Endangered (IUCN 3.1)

Scientific classification
- Kingdom: Plantae
- Clade: Tracheophytes
- Clade: Angiosperms
- Clade: Monocots
- Order: Asparagales
- Family: Orchidaceae
- Subfamily: Epidendroideae
- Genus: Bulbophyllum
- Species: B. rubrolabellum

Binomial name
- Bulbophyllum rubrolabellum T.P.Lin

Synonyms
- Bulbophyllum odoratissimum var. rubrolabellum (T.P.Lin) S.S.Ying

Species of orchid

Bulbophyllum rubrolabellum is a species of plant in the family Orchidaceae that is endemic to Taiwan. It was first described scientifically in 1975 by Tsan Piao Lin in the journal Taiwania: Science Reports of the National Taiwan University, and is the basionym for its treatment by Ying as B. odoratissimum var. rubrolabellum (T.P.Lin) S.S.Ying in 1990.
