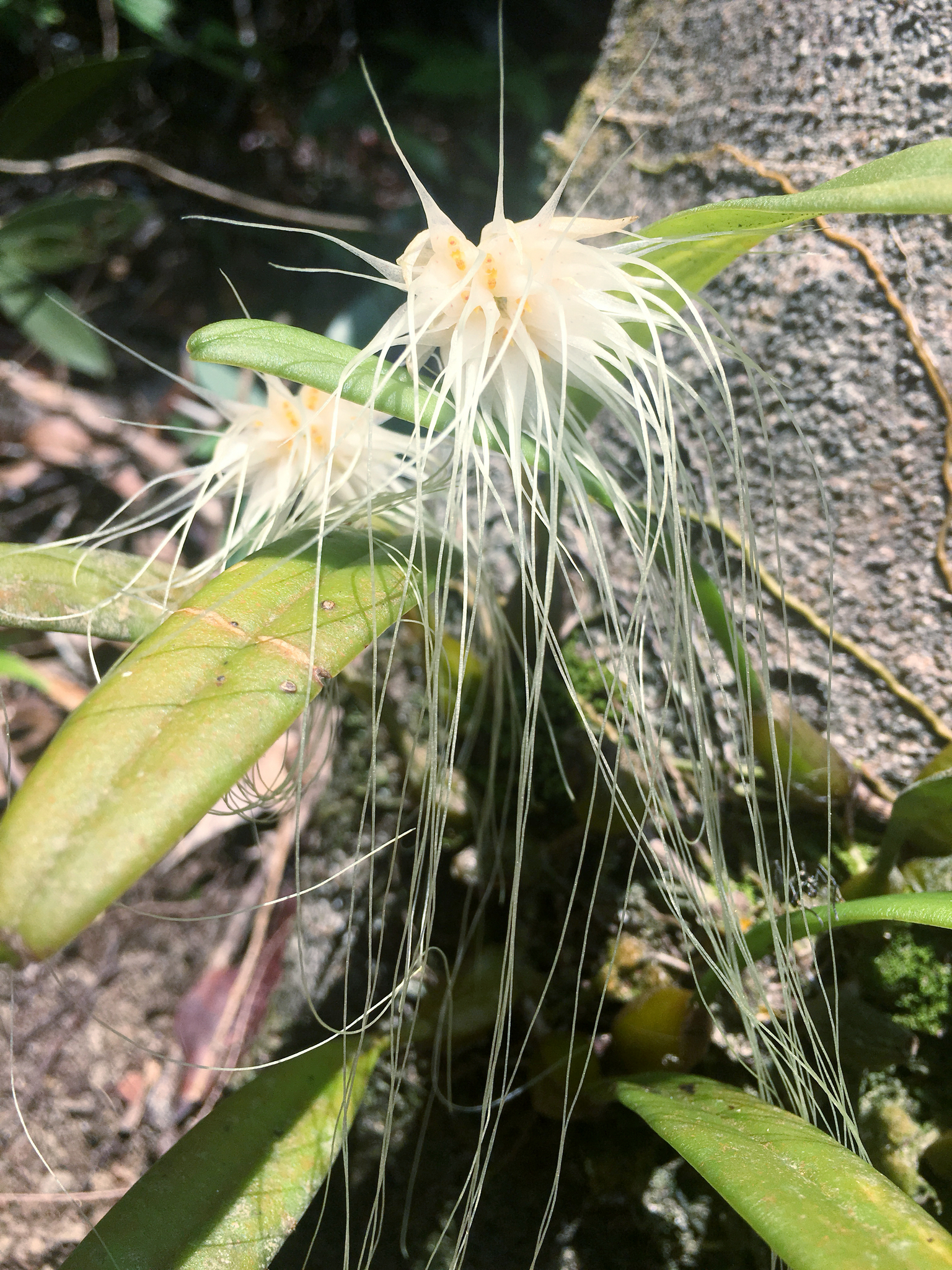
- Bulbophyllum medusae growing on Ko Pha-ngan, Thailand

Scientific classification
- Kingdom: Plantae
- Clade: Tracheophytes
- Clade: Angiosperms
- Clade: Monocots
- Order: Asparagales
- Family: Orchidaceae
- Subfamily: Epidendroideae
- Subtribe: Dendrobiinae
- Genus: Bulbophyllum
- Section: Bulbophyllum sect. Desmosanthes
- Species: B. medusae

Binomial name
- Bulbophyllum medusae (Lindl.) Rchb.f.

Synonyms
- Cirrhopetalum medusae Lindl.; Phyllorkis medusae (Lindl.) Kuntze

= Bulbophyllum medusae =

Species of orchid

Bulbophyllum medusae is an epiphytic orchid native to lowland and hill forests of Thailand, Peninsular Malaysia, Sumatra, and Borneo. It is distinguished by its rounded inflorescences bearing many small flowers with long, filamentous lateral sepals that radiate outward in loose strands.

The species was first described as Cirrhopetalum medusae by John Lindley in 1842, and transferred to Bulbophyllum by Heinrich Gustav Reichenbach in 1861.

== Distribution and habitat ==
B. medusae is recorded from Thailand, Peninsular Malaysia, Sumatra, and Borneo. Herbarium and field records place it in lowland and hill forests, where it grows as an epiphyte on living trees in humid, shaded conditions.

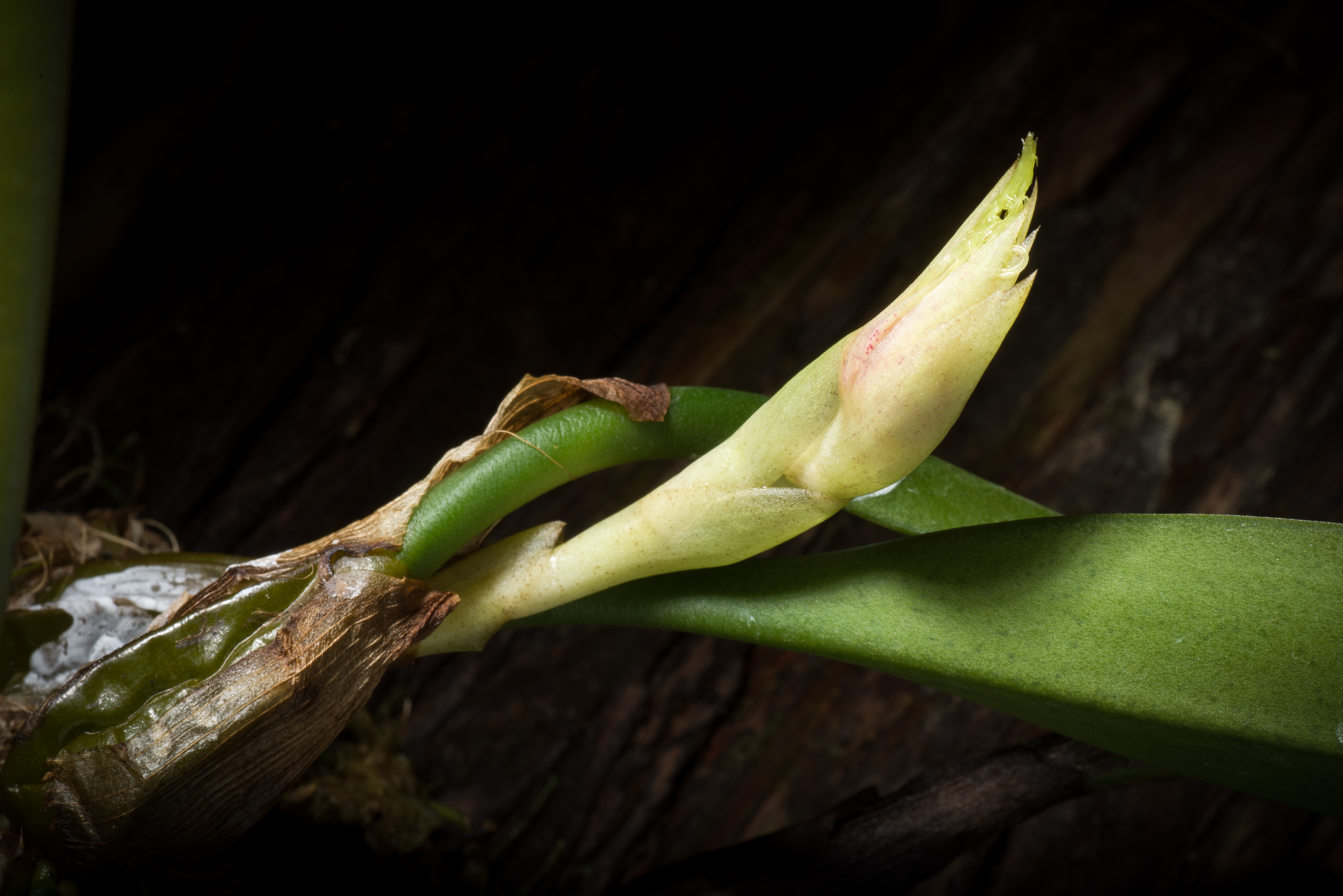
An 1861 illustration showing floral details of Bulbophyllum medusae.

Plants are most often recorded on mid-trunk or primary branches where bark remains moist but well-drained.

== Description ==
Bulbophyllum medusae forms a creeping mat of small, rounded pseudobulbs spaced along a slender rhizome. Each pseudobulb carries a single leathery leaf up to about 20 cm long.

The inflorescence arises from the base of the pseudobulb and develops into a rounded umbel of many short-stalked flowers. The lateral sepals are fused at the base before dividing into long, filamentous segments that hang freely around the floral head. The dorsal sepal and petals are smaller, and the labellum is short, mobile, and hinged at the base, a characteristic of the genus.

Cultivated plants show variable scent, ranging from faint earthy notes to no detectable fragrance.
