= Bulbophyllum cylindricum =

Scientific classification
- Kingdom: Plantae
- Clade: Tracheophytes
- Clade: Angiosperms
- Clade: Monocots
- Order: Asparagales
- Family: Orchidaceae
- Subfamily: Epidendroideae
- Genus: Bulbophyllum
- Species: B. cylindricum

Binomial name
- Bulbophyllum cylindricum King

Species of orchid

Bulbophyllum cylindricum is a species of orchid in the family Orchidaceae. It is found in Sikkim.
