= Bulbophyllum croceum =

Scientific classification
- Kingdom: Plantae
- Clade: Tracheophytes
- Clade: Angiosperms
- Clade: Monocots
- Order: Asparagales
- Family: Orchidaceae
- Subfamily: Epidendroideae
- Genus: Bulbophyllum
- Species: B. croceum

Binomial name
- Bulbophyllum croceum (Blume) Lindl.

Synonyms
- Diphyes crocea Blume 1825; Phyllorkis crocea (Blume) Kuntze 1891; Bulbophyllum medusella Ridl. 1917

Species of orchid

Bulbophyllum croceum is a species of orchid in the genus Bulbophyllum.
