= Bulbophyllum triflorum =

Scientific classification
- Kingdom: Plantae
- Clade: Tracheophytes
- Clade: Angiosperms
- Clade: Monocots
- Order: Asparagales
- Family: Orchidaceae
- Subfamily: Epidendroideae
- Genus: Bulbophyllum
- Species: B. triflorum

Binomial name
- Bulbophyllum triflorum (Breda) Blume ex Miq.

Species of orchid

Bulbophyllum triflorum is a species of orchid in the genus Bulbophyllum.Found in Sumatra to Western Java at elevations of up to 1600 meters
