= Bulbophyllum talauense =

Scientific classification
- Kingdom: Plantae
- Clade: Tracheophytes
- Clade: Angiosperms
- Clade: Monocots
- Order: Asparagales
- Family: Orchidaceae
- Subfamily: Epidendroideae
- Genus: Bulbophyllum
- Species: B. talauense

Binomial name
- Bulbophyllum talauense (J. J. Sm.) Carr

Species of orchid

Bulbophyllum talauense is a species of orchid in the genus Bulbophyllum.
