= Bulbophyllum pinicola =

Scientific classification
- Kingdom: Plantae
- Clade: Tracheophytes
- Clade: Angiosperms
- Clade: Monocots
- Order: Asparagales
- Family: Orchidaceae
- Subfamily: Epidendroideae
- Genus: Bulbophyllum
- Species: B. pinicola

Binomial name
- Bulbophyllum pinicola Gagnep.

Synonyms
- Bulbophyllum pinicola var. cambodianum Tixier

Species of orchid

Bulbophyllum pinicola is a flowering plant in the family Orchidaceae. It is a species of orchid characterized by its unique floral structure. It typically produces small reddish, and brown flowers that are borne on pendulous inflorescences. The flowers often have intricate patterns and shapes, which is typical of many Bulbophyllum species. The plant is epiphytic, meaning it grows attached to the other plants rather than in soil.
