= Bulbophyllum obtusum =

Scientific classification
- Kingdom: Plantae
- Clade: Tracheophytes
- Clade: Angiosperms
- Clade: Monocots
- Order: Asparagales
- Family: Orchidaceae
- Subfamily: Epidendroideae
- Genus: Bulbophyllum
- Species: B. obtusum

Binomial name
- Bulbophyllum obtusum (Blume) Lindl.

Species of orchid

Bulbophyllum obtusum is a species of orchid in the genus Bulbophyllum. The color of its flowers vary from all white to all yellow and are found in forests at elevations of 700 to 2200 ft.
