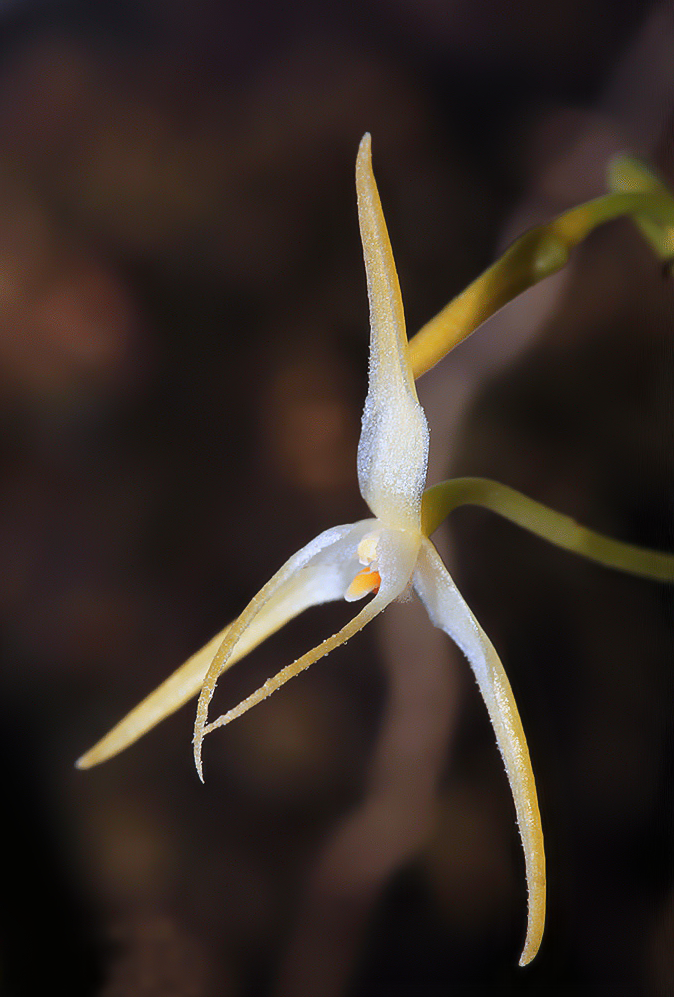

Scientific classification
- Kingdom: Plantae
- Clade: Tracheophytes
- Clade: Angiosperms
- Clade: Monocots
- Order: Asparagales
- Family: Orchidaceae
- Subfamily: Epidendroideae
- Genus: Bulbophyllum
- Species: B. laxiflorum

Binomial name
- Bulbophyllum laxiflorum (Blume) Lindl.

= Bulbophyllum laxiflorum =

Species of orchid

Bulbophyllum laxiflorum is a species of orchid in the genus Bulbophyllum.

== Location ==
It is found in Thailand, Myanmar, Laos, Cambodia, Vietnam, Malaysia, Indonesia, Borneo, Sulawesi, Sumatra, Java and the Philippines.
