= Bulbophyllum leptanthum =

Scientific classification
- Kingdom: Plantae
- Clade: Tracheophytes
- Clade: Angiosperms
- Clade: Monocots
- Order: Asparagales
- Family: Orchidaceae
- Subfamily: Epidendroideae
- Genus: Bulbophyllum
- Species: B. leptanthum

Binomial name
- Bulbophyllum leptanthum Hook. f. 1890

Synonyms
- Phyllorkis leptantha (Hook.f.) Kuntze 1891

Species of orchid

Bulbophyllum leptanthum is a species of orchid in the genus Bulbophyllum found in Sikkim to Assam.
