= Bulbophyllum sutepense =

Scientific classification
- Kingdom: Plantae
- Clade: Tracheophytes
- Clade: Angiosperms
- Clade: Monocots
- Order: Asparagales
- Family: Orchidaceae
- Subfamily: Epidendroideae
- Genus: Bulbophyllum
- Species: B. sutepense

Binomial name
- Bulbophyllum sutepense (Rolfe ex Downie) Seidenf. & Smitinand

Species of orchid

Bulbophyllum sutepense is a species of orchid in the genus Bulbophyllum from China and Southeast Asia. The small round pseudobulbs are closely spaced and each carries a single leaf.
