= Bulbophyllum evrardii =

Conservation status
- Endangered (IUCN 3.1)

Scientific classification
- Kingdom: Plantae
- Clade: Tracheophytes
- Clade: Angiosperms
- Clade: Monocots
- Order: Asparagales
- Family: Orchidaceae
- Subfamily: Epidendroideae
- Genus: Bulbophyllum
- Species: B. evrardii

Binomial name
- Bulbophyllum evrardii Gagnep.

Synonyms
- Bulbophyllum dalatense Gagnep. 1930

Species of orchid

Bulbophyllum evrardii is a flowering plant in the family Orchidaceae.
