= Bulbophyllum dempoense =

Scientific classification
- Kingdom: Plantae
- Clade: Tracheophytes
- Clade: Angiosperms
- Clade: Monocots
- Order: Asparagales
- Family: Orchidaceae
- Subfamily: Epidendroideae
- Genus: Bulbophyllum
- Species: B. dempoense

Binomial name
- Bulbophyllum dempoense J.J.Sm.

Species of orchid

Bulbophyllum dempoense is a species of orchid in the genus Bulbophyllum.

== Bibliography ==
- The Bulbophyllum-Checklist
- The Internet Orchid Species Photo Encyclopedia
