= Bulbophyllum longerepens =

Scientific classification
- Kingdom: Plantae
- Clade: Tracheophytes
- Clade: Angiosperms
- Clade: Monocots
- Order: Asparagales
- Family: Orchidaceae
- Subfamily: Epidendroideae
- Genus: Bulbophyllum
- Species: B. longerepens

Binomial name
- Bulbophyllum longerepens Ridl.

Synonyms
- Bulbophyllum bakhuizenii Steenis 1972; Bulbophyllum brevistylidium Seidenf. 1979; Bulbophyllum multiflorum (Breda) Kraenzl. 1896; Odontostylis minor Breda 1828; Odontostylis multiflora Breda 1828

Species of orchid

Bulbophyllum longerepens is a species of orchid in the genus Bulbophyllum.
