= Bulbophyllum validum =

Scientific classification
- Kingdom: Plantae
- Clade: Tracheophytes
- Clade: Angiosperms
- Clade: Monocots
- Order: Asparagales
- Family: Orchidaceae
- Subfamily: Epidendroideae
- Genus: Bulbophyllum
- Species: B. validum

Binomial name
- Bulbophyllum validum Carr 1933

Species of orchid

Bulbophyllum validum is a species of orchid in the genus Bulbophyllum from Sumatra at elevations around 5000 feet.
