= Bulbophyllum gyrochilum =

Scientific classification
- Kingdom: Plantae
- Clade: Tracheophytes
- Clade: Angiosperms
- Clade: Monocots
- Order: Asparagales
- Family: Orchidaceae
- Subfamily: Epidendroideae
- Genus: Bulbophyllum
- Species: B. gyrochilum

Binomial name
- Bulbophyllum gyrochilum Seidenf.

Species of orchid

Bulbophyllum gyrochilum is a species of epiphytic orchid described by Gunnar Seidenfaden, in the genus Bulbophyllum.
