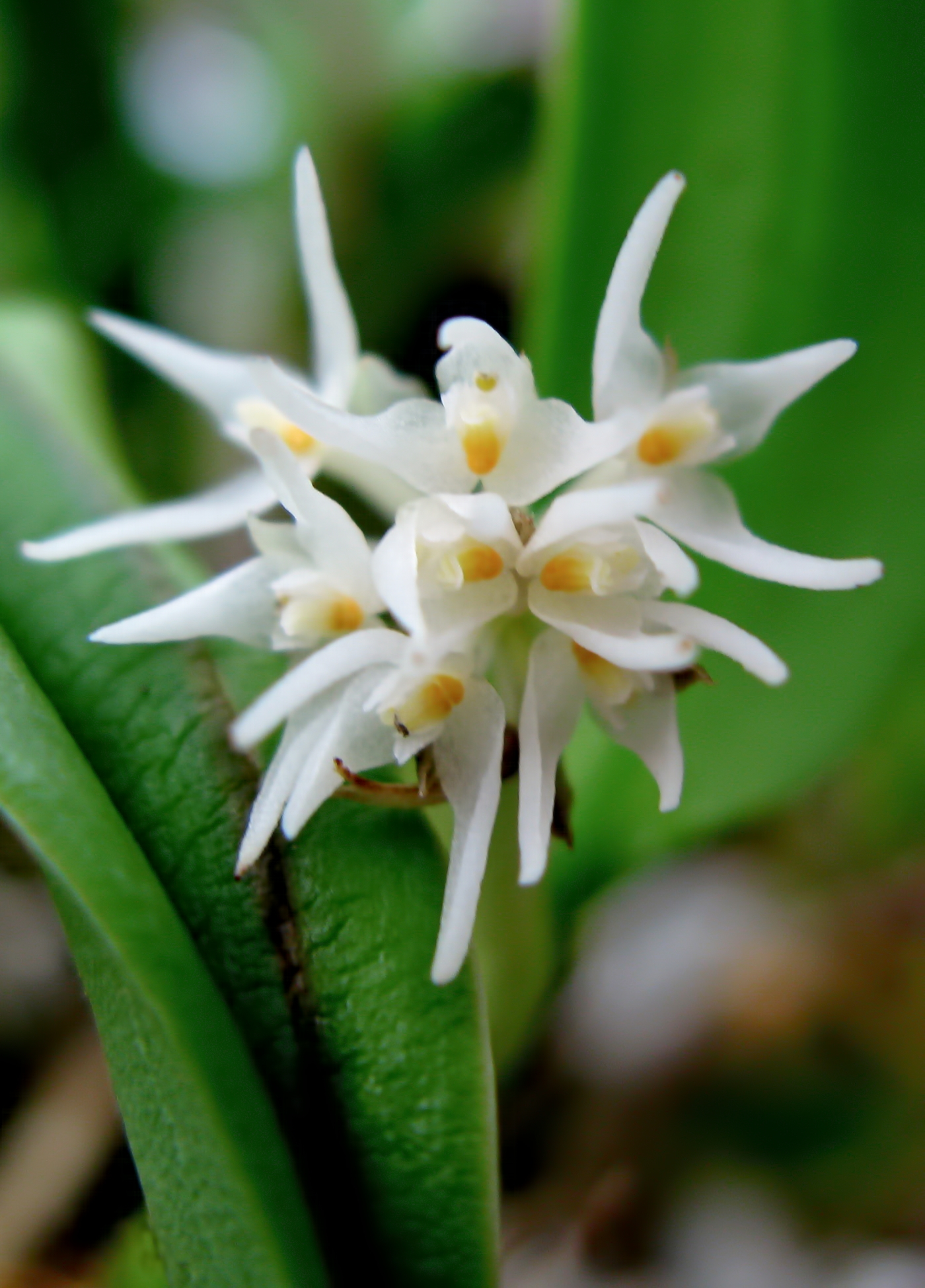

Scientific classification
- Kingdom: Plantae
- Clade: Tracheophytes
- Clade: Angiosperms
- Clade: Monocots
- Order: Asparagales
- Family: Orchidaceae
- Subfamily: Epidendroideae
- Genus: Bulbophyllum
- Species: B. stenobulbon

Binomial name
- Bulbophyllum stenobulbon C. S. P. Parish & Rchb. f.

= Bulbophyllum stenobulbon =

Species of orchid

Bulbophyllum stenobulbon is a species of orchid in the genus Bulbophyllum.
