= Bulbophyllum shweliense =

Scientific classification
- Kingdom: Plantae
- Clade: Tracheophytes
- Clade: Angiosperms
- Clade: Monocots
- Order: Asparagales
- Family: Orchidaceae
- Subfamily: Epidendroideae
- Genus: Bulbophyllum
- Species: B. shweliense

Binomial name
- Bulbophyllum shweliense W. W. Sm.

Species of orchid

Bulbophyllum shweliense is a species of orchid in the genus Bulbophyllum. It is also commonly referred to as The Shweili Valley Bulbophyllum.
