= Bulbophyllum simondii =

Scientific classification
- Kingdom: Plantae
- Clade: Tracheophytes
- Clade: Angiosperms
- Clade: Monocots
- Order: Asparagales
- Family: Orchidaceae
- Subfamily: Epidendroideae
- Genus: Bulbophyllum
- Species: B. simondii

Binomial name
- Bulbophyllum simondii Gagnep.

Species of orchid

Bulbophyllum simondii is a flowering plant in the genus Orchidaceae.
