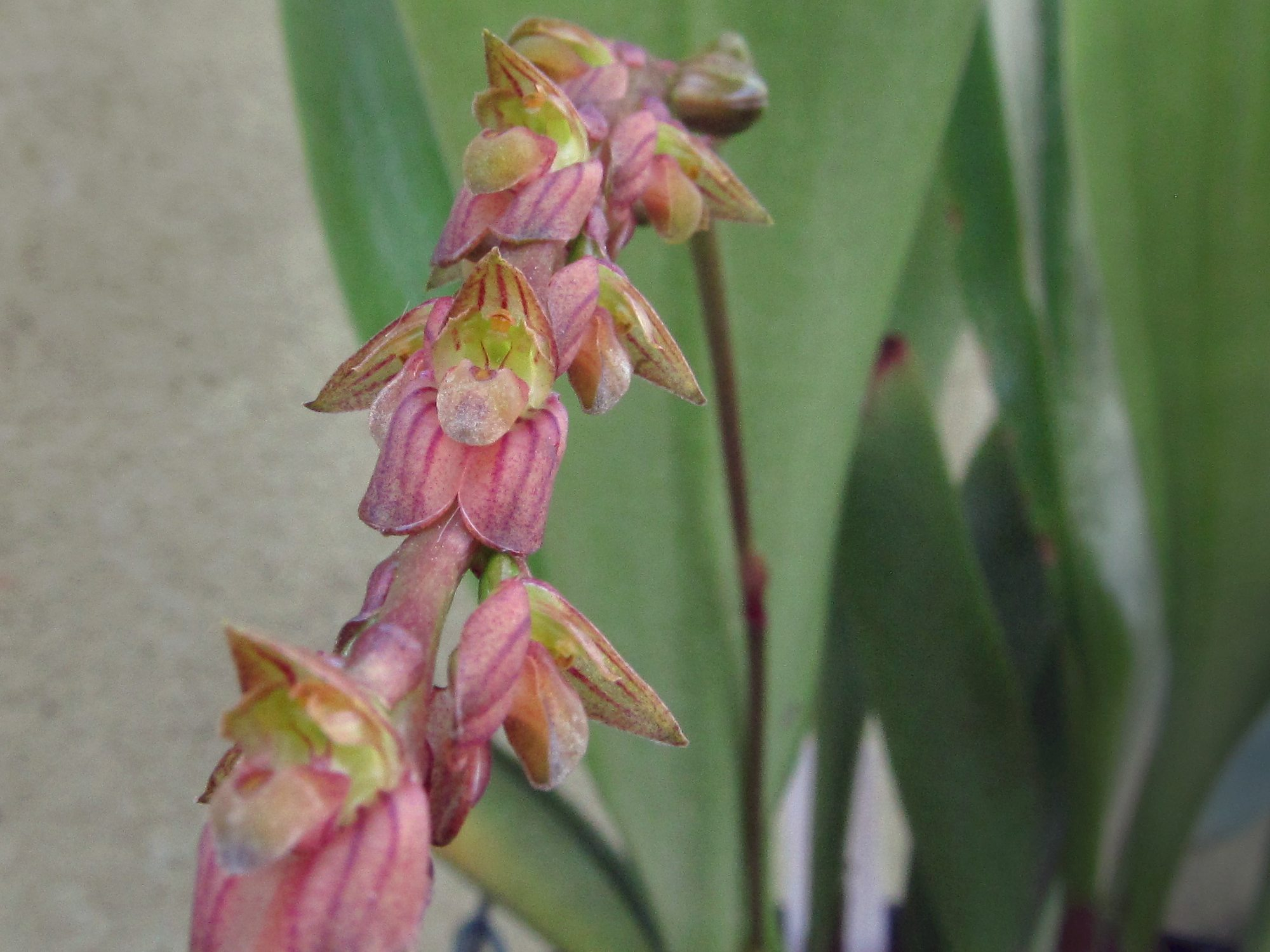
- Bulbophyllum rigidum

Scientific classification
- Kingdom: Plantae
- Clade: Tracheophytes
- Clade: Angiosperms
- Clade: Monocots
- Order: Asparagales
- Family: Orchidaceae
- Subfamily: Epidendroideae
- Genus: Bulbophyllum
- Section: Bulbophyllum sect. Brachystachyae; Benth. & Hook. f. 1883

Type species
- Bulbophyllum repens

Species
- See text

Synonyms
- Cochlia Bl. 1825; Bulbophyllum sect. Cochlia (Bl.) Benth. & Hook.f. 1883; Bulbophyllum sect. Cylindracea Pfitz. 1889; Bulbophyllum sect. Saurocephalum Schltr. 1912; Bulbophyllum sect. Globiceps Schltr. 1913; Osyricera Bl. 1825; Bulbophyllum sect. Repantia J J Verm. 2001; Bulbophyllum sect. Osyricera (Bl.) J.J. Sm. 1914; Bulbophyllum sect. Diptychanthes Rchb.f. 1857; Synarmosepalum Garay, Hamer & Siegerist 1994

= Bulbophyllum sect. Brachystachyae =

Section of flowering plants

Bulbophyllum sect. Brachystachyae is a section of the genus Bulbophyllum.

== Description ==
Species in this section have raceme dense with flowers arranged in a regular pattern.

== Distribution ==
Plants from this section are found in Southeast Asia.

== Species ==
Bulbophyllum section Brachystachyae comprises the following species:

Image	Name	Distribution	Elevation (m)
	Bulbophyllum alcicorne C.S.P.Parish & Rchb.f. 1874	Myanmar, Malaysia and Thailand	400–650 metres (1,310–2,130 ft)
	Bulbophyllum anodon J.J.Verm., Thavipoke & J.Phelps 2014	Thailand	
	Bulbophyllum apiferum Carr 1930	Thailand and Malaysia	800–1,500 metres (2,600–4,900 ft)
	Bulbophyllum atrorubens Schltr. 1906	Sulawesi, New Guinea, Moluccas, New Caledonia, Samoa and Vanuatu	200–1,400 metres (660–4,590 ft)
	Bulbophyllum atrosanguineum Aver. 2003	Vietnam	1,700 metres (5,600 ft)
	Bulbophyllum bicarinatum J.J.Verm. & A.L.Lamb 2013	Borneo	1,000 metres (3,300 ft)
	Bulbophyllum botryophorum Ridl. 1897	Malaysia and Sarawak Borneo	700–800 metres (2,300–2,600 ft)
	Bulbophyllum bromeliforme Cootes, Cabactulan, R.B.Pimentel & M.Leon 2020	Philippines (Mindanao)	900–1,000 metres (3,000–3,300 ft)
	Bulbophyllum caecilii J.J.Sm. 1927	Sumatra	
	Bulbophyllum calliferum J.J.Verm. & A.L.Lamb 2013	Borneo	1,000–2,000 metres (3,300–6,600 ft)
	Bulbophyllum conchiferum Rchb.f.1861	India	
	Bulbophyllum coniferum Ridl. 1909	Malaysia, Java, Sumatra and Borneo	1,000–2,500 metres (3,300–8,200 ft)
	Bulbophyllum cornu-cervi King 1895	Sikkim, eastern Himalayas	700 metres (2,300 ft)
	Bulbophyllum cruciferum J.J.Sm. 1917	Sumatera	1,000 metres (3,300 ft)
	Bulbophyllum cylindraceum Lindl. 1830	Nepal, eastern Himalayas, Sikkim, India, Nepal, western Himalayas, Myanmar and Thailand	
	Bulbophyllum cyrtognomom J.J.Verm. & A.L.Lamb 2008	Sabah Borneo	
	Bulbophyllum divergens J.J.Verm. & P.O'Byrne 2011	Borneo, New Guinea and Sulawesi	800–1,200 metres (2,600–3,900 ft)
	Bulbophyllum dolichodon J.J.Verm., P.O'Byrne & A.L.Lamb 2015	Borneo	900–1,000 metres (3,000–3,300 ft)
	Bulbophyllum doryphoroide Ames 1915	Philippines (Luzon)	
	Bulbophyllum erosipetalum C.Schweinf. 1951	Philippines (Mindanao)	
	Bulbophyllum evasum T.E.Hunt & Rupp 1950	Australia (Queensland)	1,000–1,600 metres (3,300–5,200 ft)
	Bulbophyllum fissibrachium J.J.Sm. 1927	Sumatra	1,700 metres (5,600 ft)
	Bulbophyllum fragosum J.J.Verm. & A.L.Lamb 2013	Borneo	2,200 metres (7,200 ft)
	Bulbophyllum globiceps Schltr. 1905	New Guinea	
	Bulbophyllum heldiorum J.J.Verm. 1991	Borneo	2,000–2,500 metres (6,600–8,200 ft)
	Bulbophyllum holttumii A.D.Hawkes 1956	Thailand and Malaysia	800–1,500 metres (2,600–4,900 ft)
	Bulbophyllum hyposiphon J.J.Verm. & A.L.Lamb 2013	Borneo	800–1,900 metres (2,600–6,200 ft)
	Bulbophyllum hyption J.J.Verm., P.O'Byrne & A.L.Lamb 2015	Borneo	800–900 metres (2,600–3,000 ft)
	Bulbophyllum kemulense J.J.Sm. 1931	Borneo	1,300–1,800 metres (4,300–5,900 ft)
	Bulbophyllum khasyanum Griff. 1851	Chinese Himalayas, eastern Himalayas, Assam, Thailand and Vietnam	1,650–2,330 metres (5,410–7,640 ft)
	Bulbophyllum kittredgei (Garay, Hamer & Siegerist) J.J.Verm. 1996	Philippines	1,000 metres (3,300 ft)
	Bulbophyllum leibergii Ames & Rolfe 1915	Philippines (Palawan, Luzon).	900 metres (3,000 ft)
	Bulbophyllum marknaivei Cootes, R.Boos & Naive 2016	Philippines (Mindanao)	1,200 metres (3,900 ft)
	Bulbophyllum merrittii Ames 1907	Philippines (Mindoro)	450 metres (1,480 ft)
	Bulbophyllum moroides J.J.Sm. 1917	Sumatra	1,400 metres (4,600 ft)
	Bulbophyllum naviculiforme P.O'Byrne & P.T.Ong 2014	peninsular Malaysia	1,500 metres (4,900 ft)
	Bulbophyllum osyricera Schltr. 1911	Java and Sabah Borneo	500–1,000 metres (1,600–3,300 ft)
	Bulbophyllum osyriceroides J.J.Sm. 1920	Java and Sumatra	50 metres (160 ft)
	Bulbophyllum petiolare Thwaites 1861	Sri Lanka	1,400 metres (4,600 ft)
	Bulbophyllum piluliferum King & Pantl. 1895	Sikkim	300–330 metres (980–1,080 ft)
	Bulbophyllum poekilon Carr 1932	Peninsula Malaysia (Bukit Fraser)	
	Bulbophyllum prasinoglossum Cabactulan, Cootes, M.Leon & R.B.Pimentel 2018	Philippines	1,200 metres (3,900 ft)
	Bulbophyllum pseudoconiferum W.Suarez & Cootes 2009	Philippines	1,400 metres (4,600 ft)
	Bulbophyllum pubiflorum Schltr. 1911	Sulawesi	1,200 metres (3,900 ft)
	Bulbophyllum purpureum Thwaites 1861	Sri Lanka	500–1,400 metres (1,600–4,600 ft)
	Bulbophyllum reclusum Seidenf. 1995	Thailand	
	Bulbophyllum repens Griff. 1851	Chinese Himalayas, eastern Himalayas, Assam, Myanmar, Thailand, Malaysia and Vietnam	300–1,600 metres (980–5,250 ft)
	Bulbophyllum retrorsum J.J.Verm. & A.L.Lamb 2008	Malaysia and Borneo	2,100 metres (6,900 ft)
	Bulbophyllum rigidum King & Pantl. 1898	eastern Himalayas, Assam India, Nepal and Sikkim	1,000–2,000 metres (3,300–6,600 ft)
	Bulbophyllum rubiferum J.J.Sm. 1918	Sarawak, Borneo and Java	1,700 metres (5,600 ft)
	Bulbophyllum rubusioides Naive, M.D. De Leon et Cootes 2017	Philippines (Mindanao)	1,700 metres (5,600 ft)
	Bulbophyllum salaccense Rchb.f. 1857	Malaysia, Borneo, Java and Sumatra	1,000–3,000 metres (3,300–9,800 ft)
	Bulbophyllum submarmoratum J.J.Sm. 1918	Java and Borneo	200–1,700 metres (660–5,580 ft)
	Bulbophyllum trifolium Ridl. 1897	peninsular Malaysia and, Sabah and Sarawak Borneo	1,400–1,500 metres (4,600–4,900 ft)
	Bulbophyllum ustulatum Aver. 2018	Vietnam	2,400–2,500 metres (7,900–8,200 ft)
	Bulbophyllum vinicolor Cabactulan, Cootes, Aurigue, R.B.Pimentel & M.Leon 2018	Philippines	1,500–2,000 metres (4,900–6,600 ft)
	Bulbophyllum xuansonii Nguyen, Averyanov, Dang, Truong 2021	Vietnam (Ninh Binh and Son La)	
	Bulbophyllum xylophyllum C.S.P.Parish & Rchb.f. 1874	Bhutan, Assam, India, Myanmar, Thailand and Vietnam	410 metres (1,350 ft)
