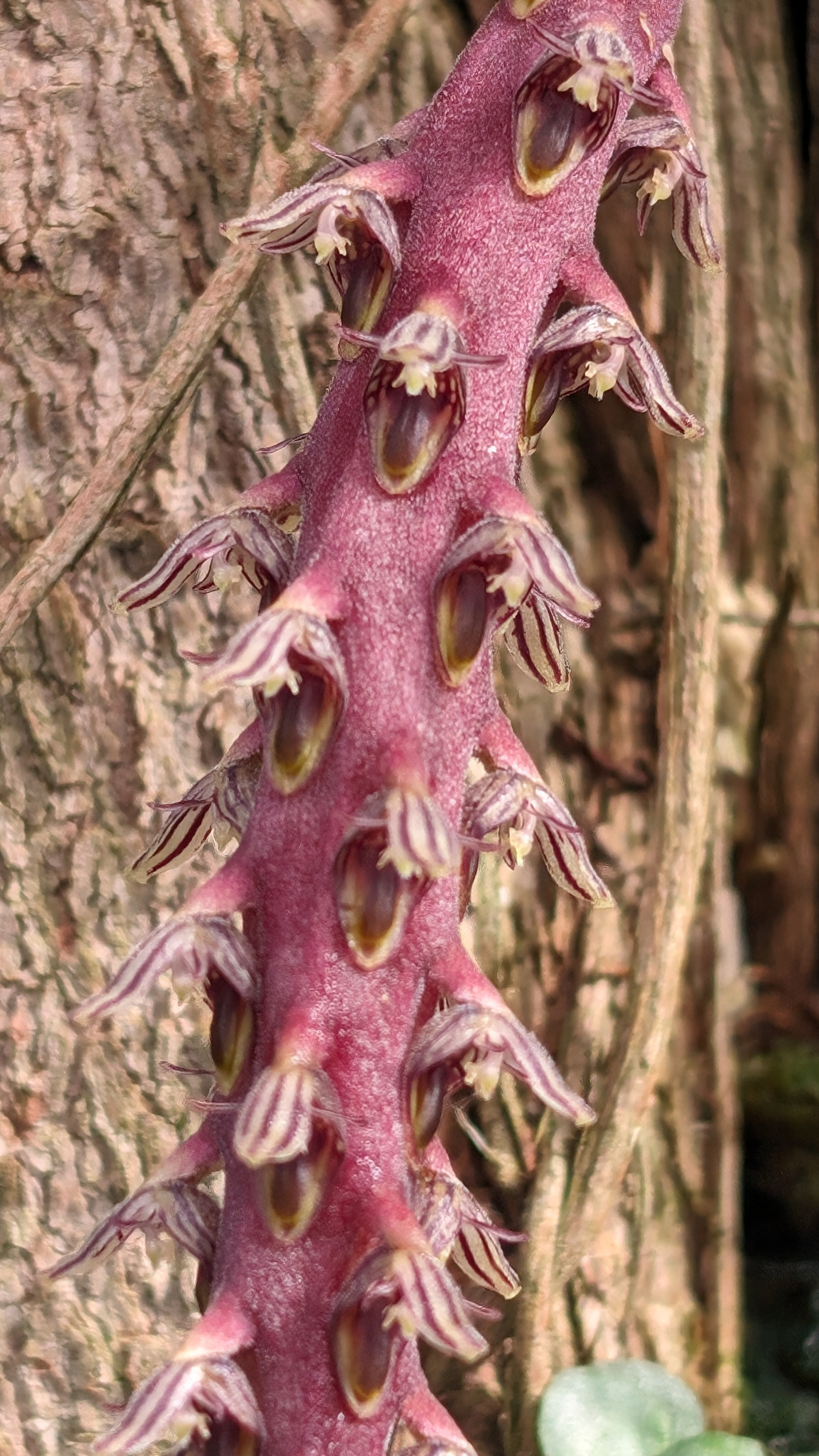
- Bulbophyllum saurocephalum

Scientific classification
- Kingdom: Plantae
- Clade: Tracheophytes
- Clade: Angiosperms
- Clade: Monocots
- Order: Asparagales
- Family: Orchidaceae
- Subfamily: Epidendroideae
- Genus: Bulbophyllum
- Section: Bulbophyllum sect. Saurocephalum; J.J. Verm 2014

Type species
- Bulbophyllum saurocephalum

Species
- See text

= Bulbophyllum sect. Saurocephalum =

Section of flowering plants

Bulbophyllum sect. Saurocephalum is a section of the genus Bulbophyllum.

== Description ==
Species in this section have pseudobulbs with a single, persistent, thick, inconspicuously veined leaf with a peduncle containing 3 to 5 bracts with many flowers. Section Saurocephalum differs from sect. Brachystachyae by its distinct pseudobulbs, elongate racemes with flowers spirally arranged, rachis distinctly thickened or not, flowers resupinate, open simultaneously, stelidia half length of the column or shorter, the upper margin winged and more prominent than the stelidia, anther with an abaxial conical crest.

== Distribution ==
Plants from this section are found in Sulawesi and the Philippines .

== Species ==
Bulbophyllum section Saurocephalum comprises the following species:

Image	Name	Distribution	Elevation (m)
	Bulbophyllum anakbaruppui J.J.Verm. & P.O'Byrne 2003	Sulawesi	1,600–1,900 metres (5,200–6,200 ft)
	Bulbophyllum ankylodon J.J.Verm. & P.O'Byrne 2008	Sulawesi	1,000 metres (3,300 ft)
	Bulbophyllum condylochilum J.J.Verm. & P.O'Byrne 2008	Sulawesi	1,200–1,400 metres (3,900–4,600 ft)
	Bulbophyllum efferatum J.J.Verm. & O'Byrne 2011	Sulawesi	
	Bulbophyllum fraternum J.J.Verm. & P.O'Byrne 2008	Sulawesi	1,100–1,200 metres (3,600–3,900 ft)
	Bulbophyllum hastiferum Schltr. 1911	Sulawesi	900–1,500 metres (3,000–4,900 ft)
	Bulbophyllum illecebrum J.J.Verm. & P.O'Byrne 2003	Sulawesi	1,600–2,500 metres (5,200–8,200 ft)
	Bulbophyllum kiamfeeanum J.J.Verm. & P.O'Byrne 2008	Sulawesi	1,400–1,500 metres (4,600–4,900 ft)
	Bulbophyllum mamasaense Wibowo, Juswara & J. Champ. 2021	Sulawesi	500–700 metres (1,600–2,300 ft)
	Bulbophyllum molle J.J.Verm. & P.O'Byrne 2008	Sulawesi	1,000–1,400 metres (3,300–4,600 ft)
	Bulbophyllum saurocephalum Rchb. f. 1886	the Philippines	1,000 metres (3,300 ft)
	Bulbophyllum stenuroides J.J.Verm. & P.O'Byrne 2011	Sulawesi	1,000 metres (3,300 ft)
	Bulbophyllum stenurum J.J.Verm. & P.O'Byrne 2003	Sulawesi	1,000 metres (3,300 ft)
	Bulbophyllum trigonobulbum Schltr. & J.J.Sm. 1914	Sulawesi	800–1,100 metres (2,600–3,600 ft)
	Bulbophyllum uviflorum P.O'Byrne 1999	Sulawesi	1,300–1,400 metres (4,300–4,600 ft)
