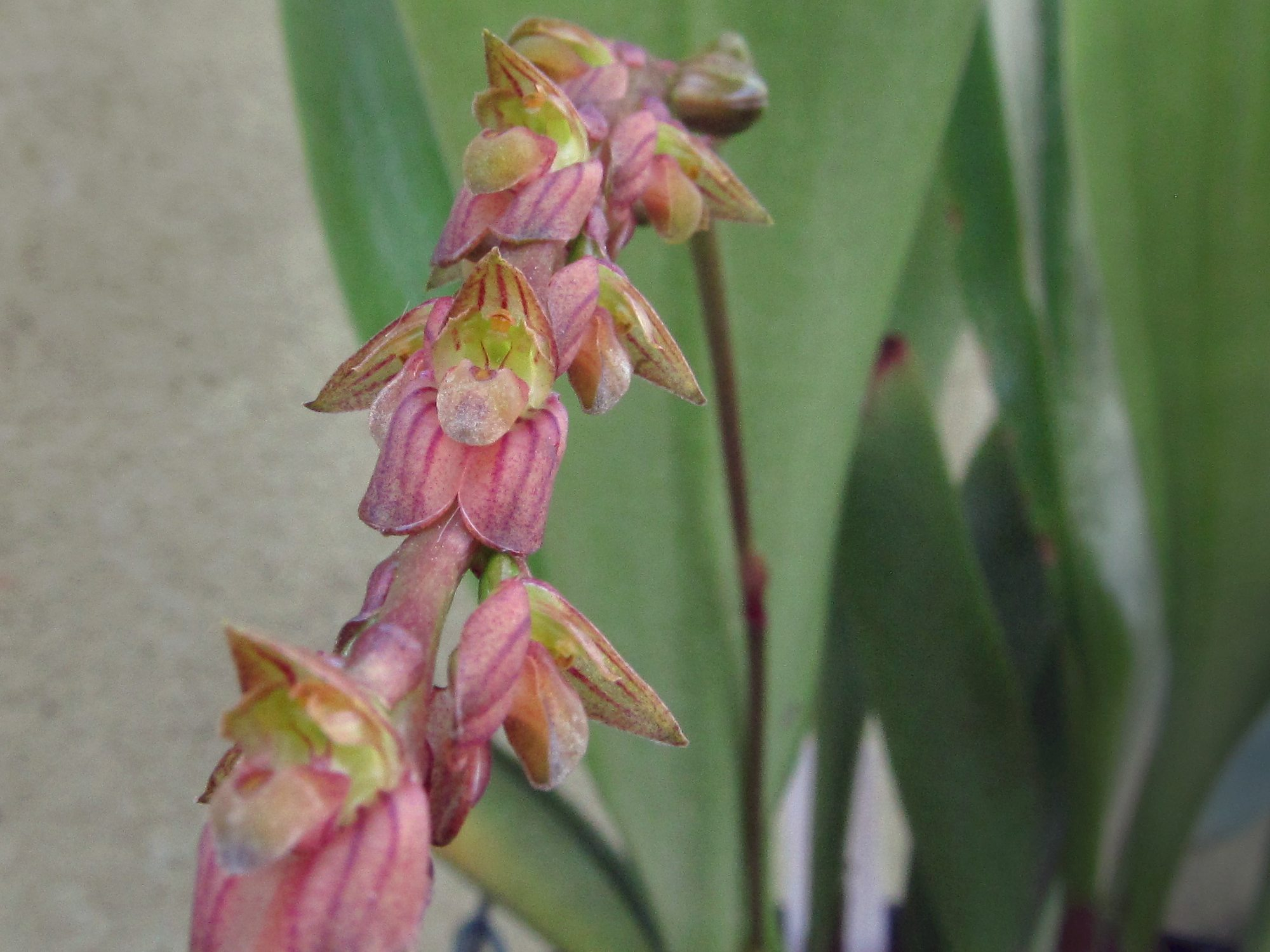

Scientific classification
- Kingdom: Plantae
- Clade: Tracheophytes
- Clade: Angiosperms
- Clade: Monocots
- Order: Asparagales
- Family: Orchidaceae
- Subfamily: Epidendroideae
- Genus: Bulbophyllum
- Species: B. rigidum

Binomial name
- Bulbophyllum rigidum King & Pantl.

= Bulbophyllum rigidum =

Species of orchid

Bulbophyllum rigidum is a species of orchid in the family Orchidaceae. It is found in eastern Himalayas, Assam India, Nepal, Bhutan and Sikkim in evergreen temperate forests.
