= Bulbophyllum alcicorne =

Scientific classification
- Kingdom: Plantae
- Clade: Tracheophytes
- Clade: Angiosperms
- Clade: Monocots
- Order: Asparagales
- Family: Orchidaceae
- Subfamily: Epidendroideae
- Genus: Bulbophyllum
- Species: B. alcicorne

Binomial name
- Bulbophyllum alcicorne E.C.Parish & Rchb.f.

Species of orchid

Bulbophyllum alcicorne is a species of orchid in the genus Bulbophyllum.
