= Bulbophyllum anakbaruppui =

Scientific classification
- Kingdom: Plantae
- Clade: Tracheophytes
- Clade: Angiosperms
- Clade: Monocots
- Order: Asparagales
- Family: Orchidaceae
- Subfamily: Epidendroideae
- Genus: Bulbophyllum
- Species: B. anakbaruppui

Binomial name
- Bulbophyllum anakbaruppui J.J.Verm. & P.O'Byrne

Species of orchid

Bulbophyllum anakbaruppui is a species of orchid in the genus Bulbophyllum.
