= Bulbophyllum atrorubens =

Scientific classification
- Kingdom: Plantae
- Clade: Tracheophytes
- Clade: Angiosperms
- Clade: Monocots
- Order: Asparagales
- Family: Orchidaceae
- Subfamily: Epidendroideae
- Genus: Bulbophyllum
- Species: B. atrorubens

Binomial name
- Bulbophyllum atrorubens Schltr.

Species of orchid

Bulbophyllum atrorubens is an epiphytic species of orchid in the genus Bulbophyllum. It can be found in Moluccas, New Caledonia, Sulawesi, New Guinea, Samoa and Vanuatu. It grows in lowland forests to montane forests at elevations of 200 to 1400 meters. The plant is small with clustered pseudobulbs with a single, apical, erect, long petiolate base. It blooms in the fall, late winter and early summer on a slender, 4 to 8" [10 to 20 cm] long inflorescence.
