= Bulbophyllum caecilii =

Scientific classification
- Kingdom: Plantae
- Clade: Tracheophytes
- Clade: Angiosperms
- Clade: Monocots
- Order: Asparagales
- Family: Orchidaceae
- Subfamily: Epidendroideae
- Genus: Bulbophyllum
- Species: B. caecilii

Binomial name
- Bulbophyllum caecilii J.J.Sm.

Species of orchid from Sumatra

Bulbophyllum caecilii is a species of orchid in the genus Bulbophyllum. Its more common name is "Caecil's Bulbophyllum." It is commonly about .16 inches (4.1 mm) and is found at Sumatra on Mt. Dempo at elevations around 1,000 meters (3,300 ft).
