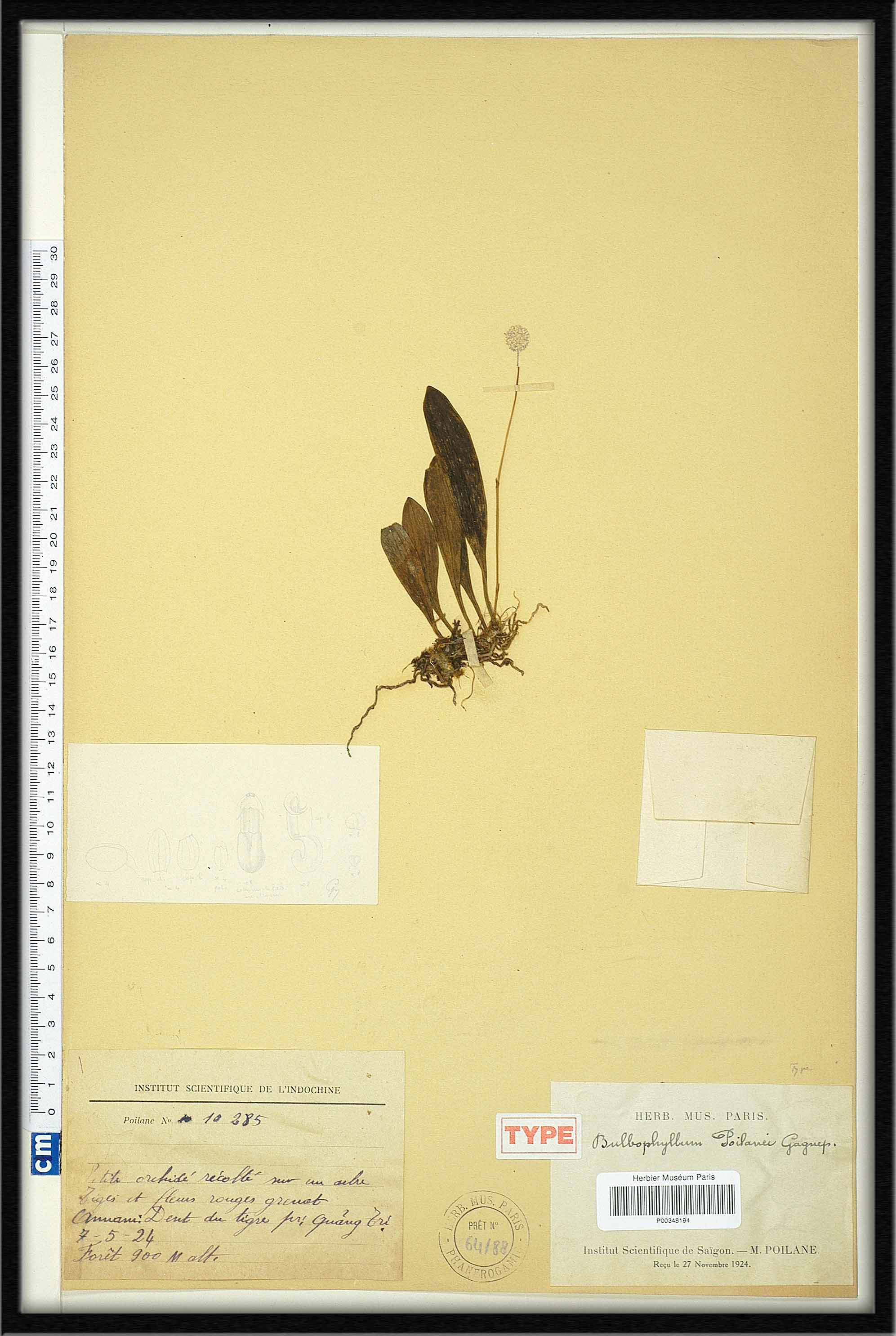

Scientific classification
- Kingdom: Plantae
- Clade: Tracheophytes
- Clade: Angiosperms
- Clade: Monocots
- Order: Asparagales
- Family: Orchidaceae
- Subfamily: Epidendroideae
- Genus: Bulbophyllum
- Species: B. repens

Binomial name
- Bulbophyllum repens Griff.

Synonyms
- Phyllorkis repens (Griff.) Kuntze; Bulbophyllum khasianum Rchb.f.; Bulbophyllum poilanei Gagnep.

= Bulbophyllum repens =

Species of orchid

Bulbophyllum repens is a species of flowering plant in the genus Orchidaceae.
