= Bulbophyllum salaccense =

Scientific classification
- Kingdom: Plantae
- Clade: Tracheophytes
- Clade: Angiosperms
- Clade: Monocots
- Order: Asparagales
- Family: Orchidaceae
- Subfamily: Epidendroideae
- Genus: Bulbophyllum
- Species: B. salaccense

Binomial name
- Bulbophyllum salaccense Rchb. f.

Synonyms
- Cochlia violacea Blume, Bijdr.; Bulbophyllum cochlia Garay, Hamer & Siegerist; Bulbophyllum similare Garay, Hamer & Siegerist; Bulbophyllum violaceum (Blume) Rchb.f. in W.G.Walpers

Species of orchid

Bulbophyllum salaccense is a species of orchid in the genus Bulbophyllum. It was formerly known as Cochlia violacea, the sole species in the monotypic genus Cochlia.
