= Bulbophyllum khasyanum =

Scientific classification
- Kingdom: Plantae
- Clade: Tracheophytes
- Clade: Angiosperms
- Clade: Monocots
- Order: Asparagales
- Family: Orchidaceae
- Subfamily: Epidendroideae
- Genus: Bulbophyllum
- Species: B. khasyanum

Binomial name
- Bulbophyllum khasyanum Griff.

Synonyms
- Bulbophyllum cylindraceum var. khasyanum (Griff.) Hook.f.; Bulbophyllum bowringianum Rchb.f.; Bulbophyllum conchiferum Rchb.f.; Bulbophyllum gibsonii Lindl. ex Rchb.f.; Phyllorkis conchifera (Rchb.f.) Kuntze

Species of orchid

Bulbophyllum khasyanum is a species of flowering plant in the family Orchidaceae.
