= Bulbophyllum cruciferum =

Scientific classification
- Kingdom: Plantae
- Clade: Tracheophytes
- Clade: Angiosperms
- Clade: Monocots
- Order: Asparagales
- Family: Orchidaceae
- Subfamily: Epidendroideae
- Genus: Bulbophyllum
- Species: B. cruciferum

Binomial name
- Bulbophyllum cruciferum J.J.Sm.

Species of orchid

Bulbophyllum cruciferum is a species of orchid in the genus Bulbophyllum found in Sumatera at elevations around 1000 meters.
