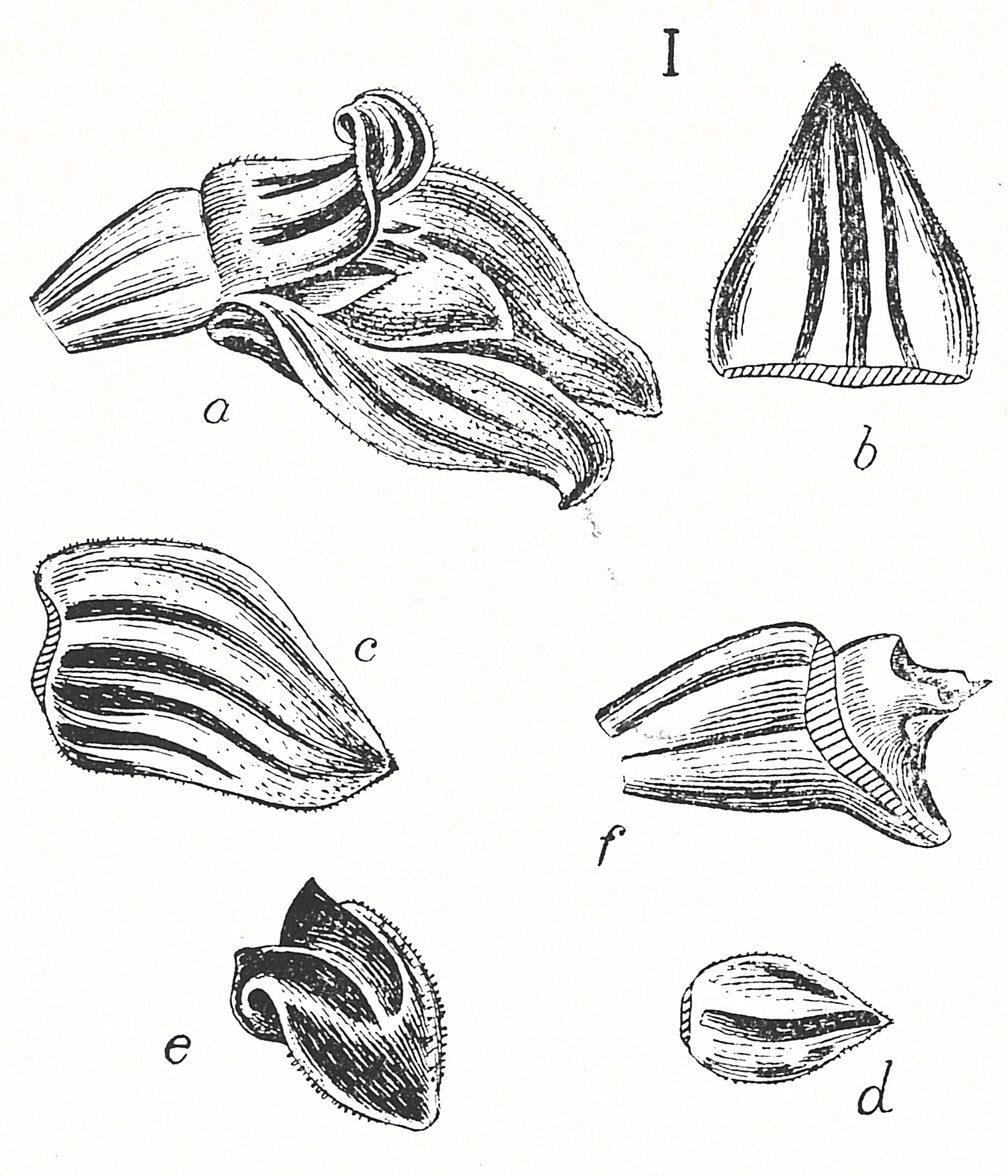

Scientific classification
- Kingdom: Plantae
- Clade: Tracheophytes
- Clade: Angiosperms
- Clade: Monocots
- Order: Asparagales
- Family: Orchidaceae
- Subfamily: Epidendroideae
- Genus: Bulbophyllum
- Species: B. coniferum

Binomial name
- Bulbophyllum coniferum Ridl.

Synonyms
- Bulbophyllum eruciferum J.J.Sm. 1910 publ. 1911; Bulbophyllum musciferum Ridl. 1915; Bulbophyllum obscurum J.J.Sm. 1910; Bulbophyllum reflexum Ames & C.Schweinf. 1920

= Bulbophyllum coniferum =

Species of orchid

Bulbophyllum coniferum is a species of orchid from the genus Bulbophyllum family.
