= Bulbophyllum kittredgei =

Scientific classification
- Kingdom: Plantae
- Clade: Tracheophytes
- Clade: Angiosperms
- Clade: Monocots
- Order: Asparagales
- Family: Orchidaceae
- Subfamily: Epidendroideae
- Genus: Bulbophyllum
- Species: B. kittredgei

Binomial name
- Bulbophyllum kittredgei (Garay, Hamer & Siegerist) J.J.Verm.

Synonyms
- Synarmosepalum kittredgei Garay, Hamer & Siegerist

Species of orchid

Bulbophyllum kittredgei is a species of flowering plant in the family Orchidaceae.
