= Bulbophyllum purpureum =

Scientific classification
- Kingdom: Plantae
- Clade: Tracheophytes
- Clade: Angiosperms
- Clade: Monocots
- Order: Asparagales
- Family: Orchidaceae
- Subfamily: Epidendroideae
- Genus: Bulbophyllum
- Species: B. purpureum

Binomial name
- Bulbophyllum purpureum Thwaites 1861

Species of orchid

Bulbophyllum purpureum, also known as the purple bulbolphyllum, is a species of miniature orchid from the genus Bulbophyllum found in Sri LLanka. The Purple Bulbophyllum has pale, yellow flowers, and gets its name from its leaves, which are typically dark green with purple edges from above and purple below. It blooms in September to December.
