= Bulbophyllum cornu-cervi =

Scientific classification
- Kingdom: Plantae
- Clade: Tracheophytes
- Clade: Angiosperms
- Clade: Monocots
- Order: Asparagales
- Family: Orchidaceae
- Subfamily: Epidendroideae
- Genus: Bulbophyllum
- Species: B. cornu-cervi

Binomial name
- Bulbophyllum cornu-cervi King

Species of orchid

Bulbophyllum cornu-cervi is a species of orchid in the family Orchidaceae.
