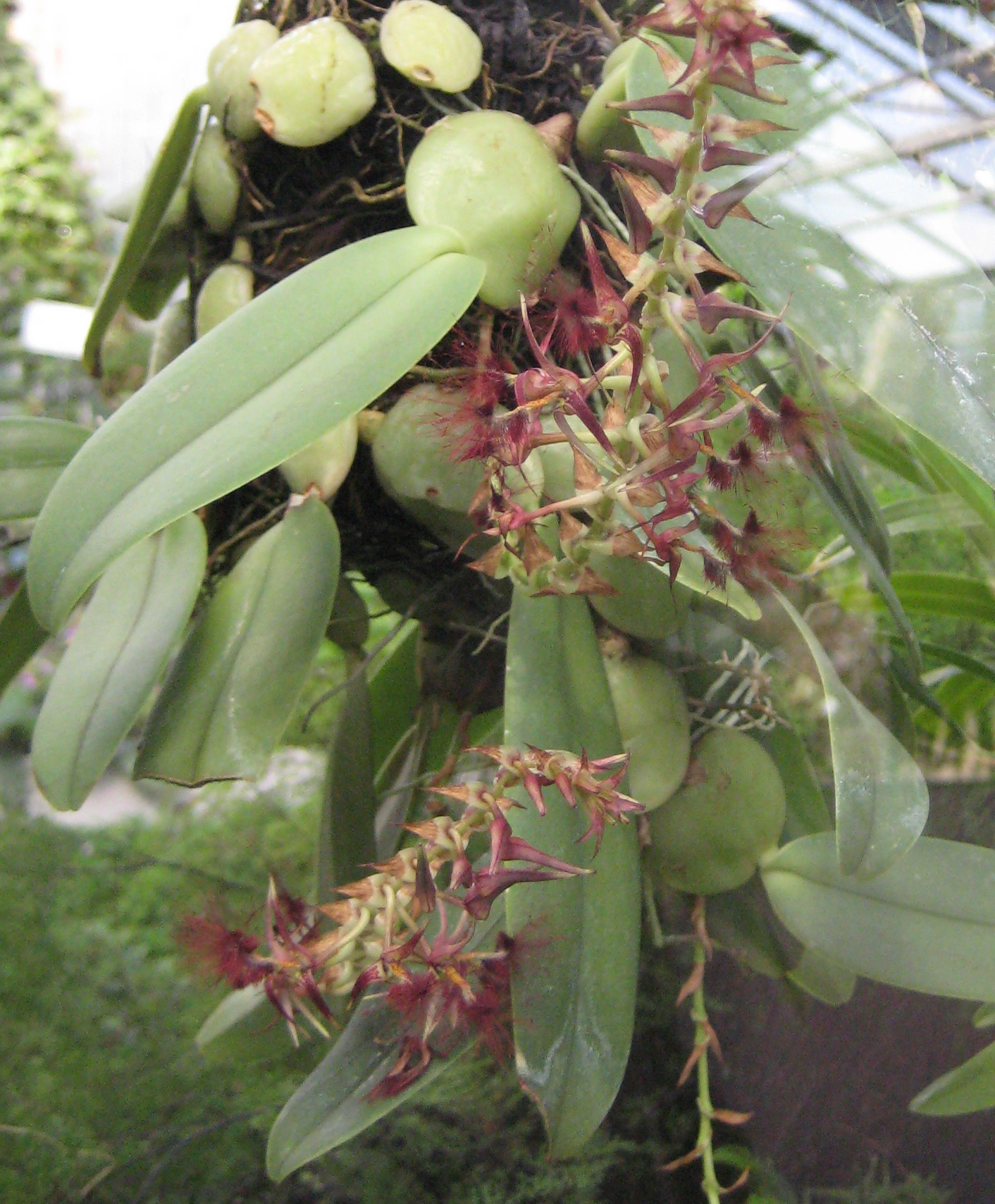
- Bulbophyllum barbigerum

Scientific classification
- Kingdom: Plantae
- Clade: Tracheophytes
- Clade: Angiosperms
- Clade: Monocots
- Order: Asparagales
- Family: Orchidaceae
- Subfamily: Epidendroideae
- Genus: Bulbophyllum
- Section: Bulbophyllum sect. Ptiloglossum; Lindl. 1862

Type species
- Bulbophyllum barbigerum

Species
- See text

Synonyms
- Bulbophyllum sect. Trichopus Schlechter 1924

= Bulbophyllum sect. Ptiloglossum =

Section of flowering plants

Bulbophyllum sect. Ptiloglossum is a section of the genus Bulbophyllum.

== Description ==
Species in this section is creeping rhizomes giving rise to pseudobulbs with 1 - 2 leaves

== Distribution ==
Plants from this section are found in Africa.

== Species ==
Bulbophyllum section Ptiloglossum comprises the following species:

Image	Name	Distribution	Elevation (m)
	Bulbophyllum alinae Szlach. 2001	Madagascar	200 metres (660 ft)
	Bulbophyllum ballii P.J.Cribb 1977	Zambia and Zimbabwe	1,000 metres (3,300 ft)
	Bulbophyllum barbigerum Lindley 1837	Ivory Coast, Sierra Leone, Liberia, Nigeria, Gabon, Cameroon, Central African Republic, Congo and Zaire	900–2,300 metres (3,000–7,500 ft)
	Bulbophyllum bavonis J.J.Verm. 1984	Tanzania	1,500–1,700 metres (4,900–5,600 ft)
	Bulbophyllum blepharochilum Garay 1999	Cameroon	
	Bulbophyllum burttii Summerh. 1953	Rwanda and Zaire	1,900–2,100 metres (6,200–6,900 ft)
	Bulbophyllum calvum Summerh. 1966	Nigeria and Cameroon	1,800 metres (5,900 ft)
	Bulbophyllum caniceps Hermans, Sieder & Andriant. 2021	Madagascar	1,000 metres (3,300 ft)
	Bulbophyllum capituliflorum Rolfe 1906	Gabon, Congo and Zaire	
	Bulbophyllum cochleatum Lindl. 1862	Guinea, Ivory Coast, Liberia, Nigeria, Sierra Leone, Gabon, Rwanda, Zaire, Sudan, Kenya, Tanzania, Uganda, Malawi and Zambia	900–2,200 metres (3,000–7,200 ft)
	Bulbophyllum cocoinum Bateman ex Lindl. 1837	Sierra Leone, Ivory Coast, Liberia, Ghana, Gabon, Gulf of Guinea Islands, Cameroon, Central African Republic, Zaire, Angola and Uganda	400–2,000 metres (1,300–6,600 ft)
	Bulbophyllum danii Pérez-Vera 2003	Ivory Coast	800 metres (2,600 ft)
	Bulbophyllum expallidum J.J.Verm. 1984	Zaire, Rwanda, Malawi, Zambia and Tanzania	800–2,100 metres (2,600–6,900 ft)
	Bulbophyllum gravidum Lindl. 1862	Equatorial Guinea and Cameroon	1,500 metres (4,900 ft)
	Bulbophyllum inornatum J.J.Verm. 1987	Tanzania	
	Bulbophyllum inops Rchb.f. 1880	Africa	
	Bulbophyllum intertextum Lindl. 1862	Angola, Cameroon, Equatorial Guinea, Ethiopia, Gabon, Guinea, Ivory Coast, Kenya, Liberia, Malawi, Nigeria, Sao Tome e Principe, Sierra Leone, Tanzania, Zaire, Zambia, Zimbabwe and the Seychelles Islands	300–1,900 metres (980–6,230 ft)
	Bulbophyllum ivorense P.J.Cribb & Pérez-Vera 1975	Guinea, Liberia, Ivory Coast, Nigeria, Cameroon, Gabon and Zaire	700 metres (2,300 ft)
	Bulbophyllum jaapii Szlach. & Olszewski 2001	Cameroon (Mount Kupe, a dormant volcano on the Western High Plateau)	1,800 metres (5,900 ft)
	Bulbophyllum josephi (Kuntze) Summerh. 1945	Guinea, Ivory Coast, Liberia, Nigeria, Burundi, Cameroon, Equatorial Guinea, Gabon, Gulf of Guinea Islands, Rwanda, Zaire, Ethiopia, Kenya, Tanzania, Uganda, Malawi, Mozambique, Zambia and Zimbabwe	850–2,100 metres (2,790–6,890 ft)
	Bulbophyllum kivuense J.J.Verm. 1986	Rwanda	1,900 metres (6,200 ft)
	Bulbophyllum mediocre Summerh. ex Exell 1959	Principe and Sao Tome	700–1,550 metres (2,300–5,090 ft)
	Bulbophyllum moldenkeanum Summerh. 1952	Madagascar	
	Bulbophyllum nigericum Summerh. 1962	Cameroon (Enyandong, Mt Kupe and the Bakossi Mountains), and Nigeria	1,000–2,050 metres (3,280–6,730 ft)
	Bulbophyllum nigritianum Rendle 1913	Sierra Leone, Ghana, Ivory Coast, Liberia, Nigeria, Gulf of Guinea Islands Gabon and Zaire	0–1,200 metres (0–3,937 ft)
	Bulbophyllum pandanetorum Summerh. 1953 publ. 1954	Cameroon and Gabon	200–950 metres (660–3,120 ft)
	Bulbophyllum pauwelsianum Stévart & Droissart 2014	Gabon	200 metres (660 ft)
	Bulbophyllum pipio Rchb.f 1876	Sierra Leone, Ghana, Ivory Coast, Nigeria and Cameroon	
	Bulbophyllum prorepens Summerh. 1953 publ. 1954	Burundi, Rwanda and Zaire	1,900–2,400 metres (6,200–7,900 ft)
	Bulbophyllum rugosibulbum Summerh. 1960	Tanzania, Zambia and Malawi	1,200–1,800 metres (3,900–5,900 ft)
	Bulbophyllum saltatorium Lindl. 1837	Ghana, Ivory Coast, Liberia, Nigeria, Sierra Leone, Cameroon, Congo, Equatorial Guinea, Gabon, Gulf of Guinea Islands, Central African Republic, Zaire, Rwanda, Angola and Uganda	900 metres (3,000 ft)
	Bulbophyllum scariosum Summerh. 1953	Guinea, Sierra Leone, Ivory Coast and the Gulf of Guinea Islands	1,000–1,800 metres (3,300–5,900 ft)
	Bulbophyllum schimperianum Kraenzl. 1902	Liberia, Nigeria, Central African Republic, Congo, Gabon, Zaire and Uganda	2,000 metres (6,600 ft)
	Bulbophyllum schinzianum Kraenzl. ex De Wild. & T. Durand 1862	Ghana, Ivory Coast, Nigeria, Cameroons, Gabon and Zaire	0–800 metres (0–2,625 ft)
	Bulbophyllum stolzii Schltr. 1915	Tanzania and Malawi	1,300–2,500 metres (4,300–8,200 ft)
	Bulbophyllum subligaculiferum J.J.Verm. 1987	Gabon	570 metres (1,870 ft)
	Bulbophyllum vanum J.J.Verm. 1984	Gabon and Zaire	500 metres (1,600 ft)
	Bulbophyllum vulcanicum Kraenzl. 1914	Burundi, Rwanda, Zaire and Uganda	2,000–2,400 metres (6,600–7,900 ft)
