= Bulbophyllum gravidum =

Conservation status
- Vulnerable (IUCN 2.3)

Scientific classification
- Kingdom: Plantae
- Clade: Tracheophytes
- Clade: Angiosperms
- Clade: Monocots
- Order: Asparagales
- Family: Orchidaceae
- Subfamily: Epidendroideae
- Genus: Bulbophyllum
- Species: B. gravidum

Binomial name
- Bulbophyllum gravidum Lindl.

Synonyms
- Bulbophyllum cochleatum var. gravidum (Lindl.) J.J.Verm

Species of orchid

Bulbophyllum gravidum is a species of epiphytic plant in the family Orchidaceae that is found in Equatorial Guinea and Cameroon (Bioko and Mount Cameroon, respectively). Its natural habitats are in montane, subtropical or tropical dry forests, at elevations of about 1,500 meters. The Mount Cameroon habitat, in particular, is threatened by the clearing of forest for the purpose of cocoyam (Colocasia esculenta) farming.

== Taxonomy ==
Bulbophyllum gravidum was first described botanically in 1862 by John Lindley. It was treated by the botanist Vermeulen, however, as B. cochleatum var. gravidum (Lindl.) J.J.Verm in 1986, using B. gravidum as its basionym.
