= Bulbophyllum rugosibulbum =

Scientific classification
- Kingdom: Plantae
- Clade: Tracheophytes
- Clade: Angiosperms
- Clade: Monocots
- Order: Asparagales
- Family: Orchidaceae
- Subfamily: Epidendroideae
- Genus: Bulbophyllum
- Species: B. rugosibulbum

Binomial name
- Bulbophyllum rugosibulbum Summerh.

Species of orchid

Bulbophyllum rugosibulbum is a species of orchid in the genus Bulbophyllum. It is one of several orchids first discovered by the Northern Rhodesian forestry officer Wilfred D. Holmes.
