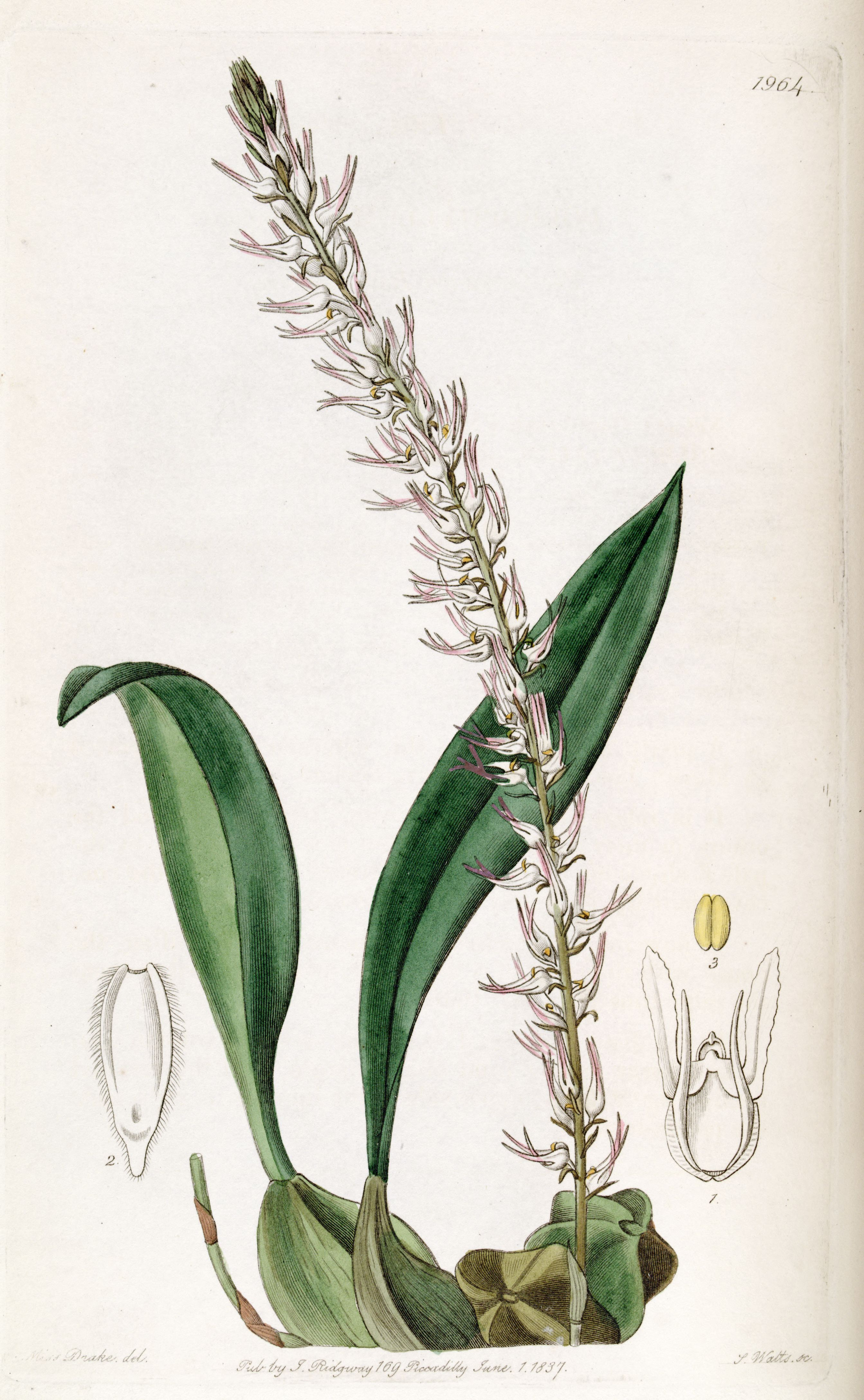

Scientific classification
- Kingdom: Plantae
- Clade: Tracheophytes
- Clade: Angiosperms
- Clade: Monocots
- Order: Asparagales
- Family: Orchidaceae
- Subfamily: Epidendroideae
- Genus: Bulbophyllum
- Species: B. cocoinum

Binomial name
- Bulbophyllum cocoinum Bateman ex Lindl. (1837)

Synonyms
- Bulbophyllum andongense Rchb.f. (1865); Bulbophyllum vitiense Rolfe (1893); Bulbophyllum brevidenticulatum De Wild. (1916)

= Bulbophyllum cocoinum =

Coconut bulbophyllum

Species of orchid

Bulbophyllum cocoinum (coconut bulbophyllum) is a species of orchid.
