= Bulbophyllum ivorense =

Scientific classification
- Kingdom: Plantae
- Clade: Tracheophytes
- Clade: Angiosperms
- Clade: Monocots
- Order: Asparagales
- Family: Orchidaceae
- Subfamily: Epidendroideae
- Genus: Bulbophyllum
- Species: B. ivorense

Binomial name
- Bulbophyllum ivorense P. J. Cribb & Perez-Vera

Species of orchid

Bulbophyllum ivorense is a species of orchid in the genus Bulbophyllum. They are found in Tropical Moist Forests in the countries touching the Gulf of Guinea in Africa. It was described by Cribb and Perez-Vera.
