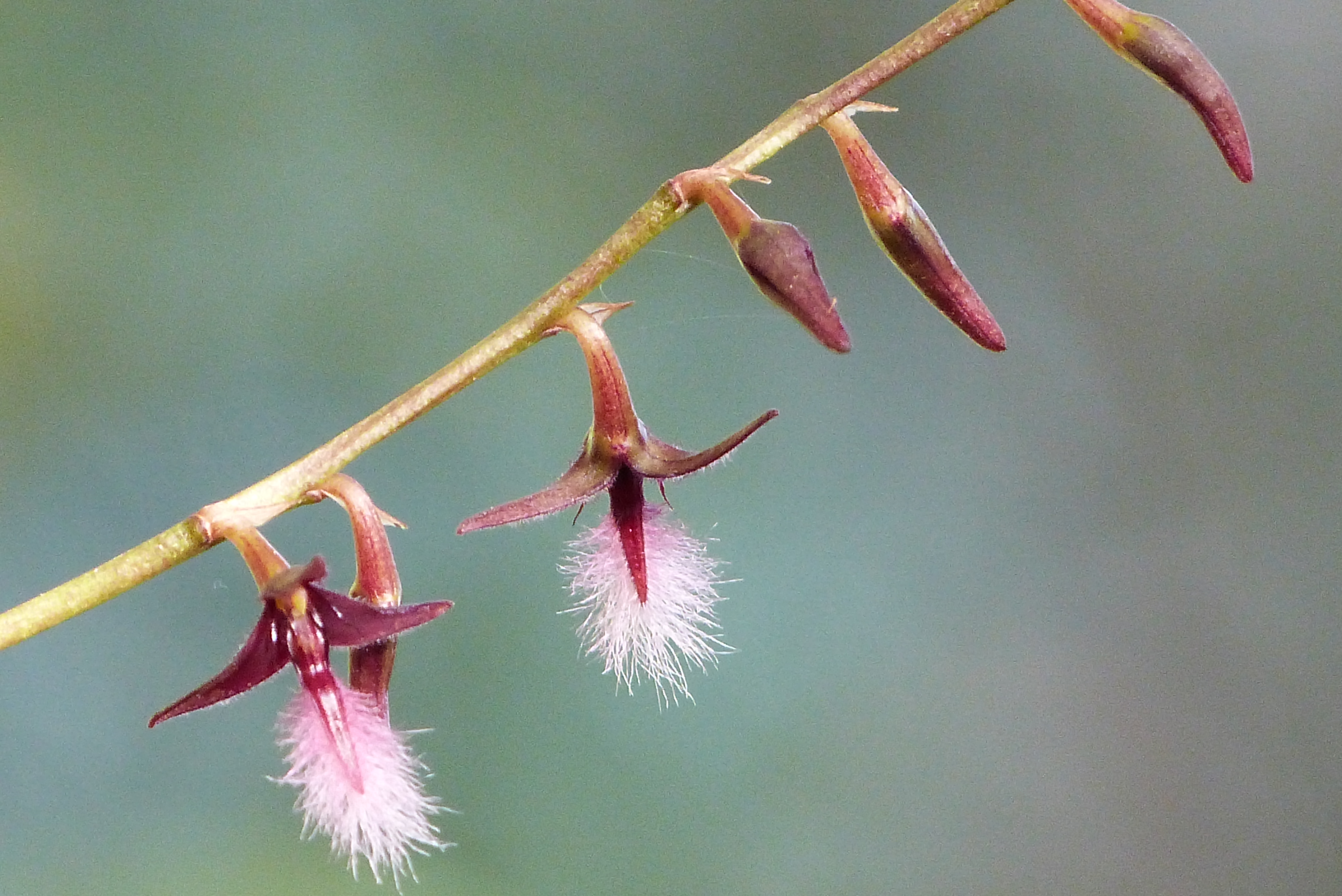

Scientific classification
- Kingdom: Plantae
- Clade: Tracheophytes
- Clade: Angiosperms
- Clade: Monocots
- Order: Asparagales
- Family: Orchidaceae
- Subfamily: Epidendroideae
- Genus: Bulbophyllum
- Species: B. saltatorium

Binomial name
- Bulbophyllum saltatorium Lindl. (1837)

Synonyms
- Phyllorkis saltatoria (Lindl.) Kuntze (1891)

= Bulbophyllum saltatorium =

Dancing bulbophyllum

Species of orchid

Bulbophyllum saltatorium (dancing bulbophyllum) is a species of orchid.
