= Bulbophyllum subligaculiferum =

Scientific classification
- Kingdom: Plantae
- Clade: Tracheophytes
- Clade: Angiosperms
- Clade: Monocots
- Order: Asparagales
- Family: Orchidaceae
- Subfamily: Epidendroideae
- Genus: Bulbophyllum
- Species: B. subligaculiferum

Binomial name
- Bulbophyllum subligaculiferum J. J. Verm.

Species of orchid

Bulbophyllum subligaculiferum is a species of orchid in the genus Bulbophyllum endemic to the forests of Cameroon and Gabon. As a result of its decreasing population, it has been listed as 'Endangered' under criteria B2ab(iii,v) of the IUCN Red List of Threatened Species 2018.
