= Bulbophyllum mediocre =

Conservation status
- Endangered (IUCN 3.1)

Scientific classification
- Kingdom: Plantae
- Clade: Tracheophytes
- Clade: Angiosperms
- Clade: Monocots
- Order: Asparagales
- Family: Orchidaceae
- Subfamily: Epidendroideae
- Genus: Bulbophyllum
- Species: B. mediocre

Binomial name
- Bulbophyllum mediocre Summerh. ex Excell

Species of orchid

Bulbophyllum mediocre is a species of orchid in the genus Bulbophyllum.
