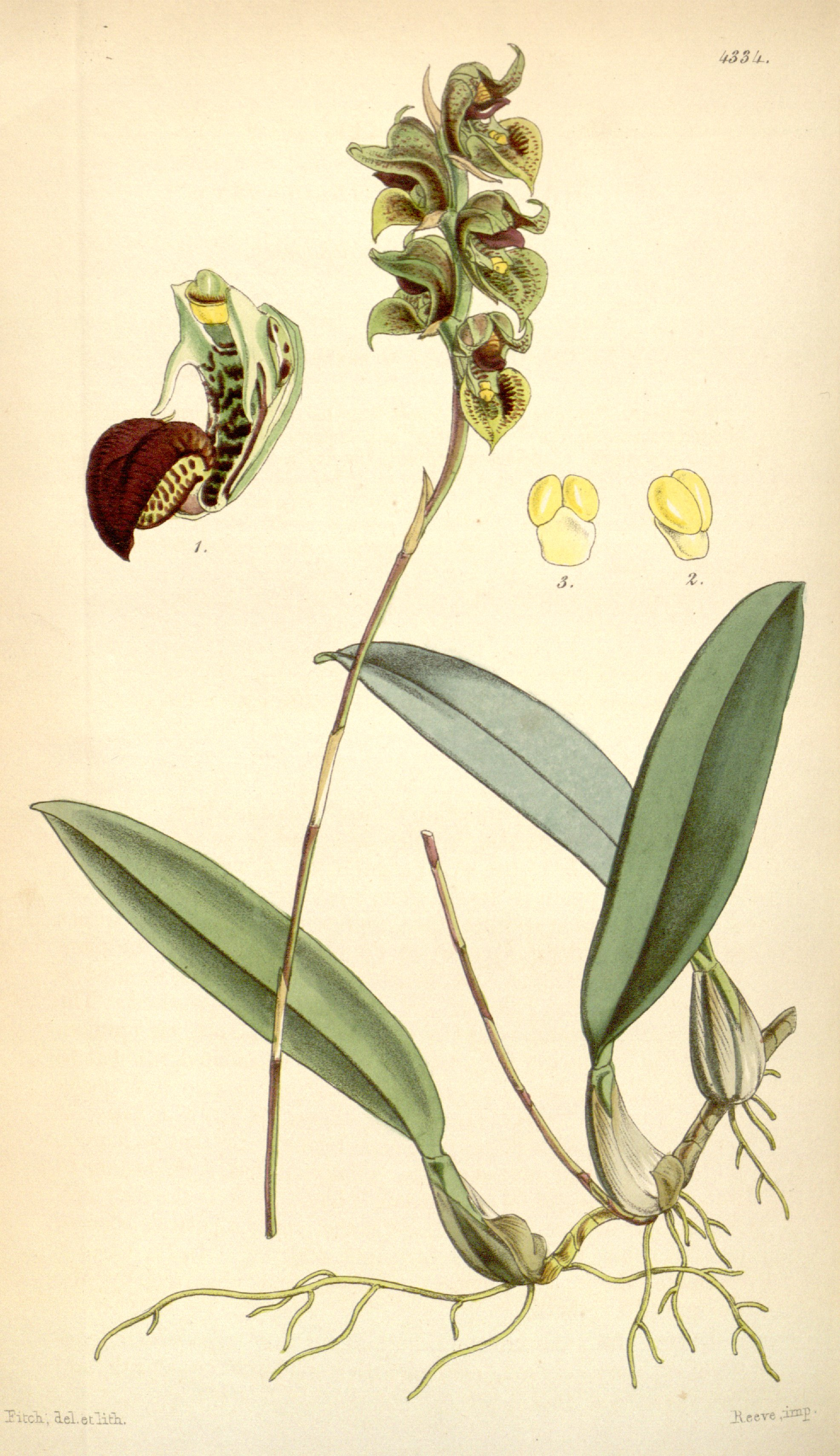
- Bulbophyllum malachadenia from Curtis Botanical Magazine

Scientific classification
- Kingdom: Plantae
- Clade: Tracheophytes
- Clade: Angiosperms
- Clade: Monocots
- Order: Asparagales
- Family: Orchidaceae
- Subfamily: Epidendroideae
- Genus: Bulbophyllum
- Section: Bulbophyllum sect. Napelli; Rchb. f 1861

Type species
- Bulbophyllum nagelii

Species
- See text

= Bulbophyllum sect. Napelli =

Section of flowering plants

Bulbophyllum sect. Napelli is a section of the genus Bulbophyllum. It is one of six Bulbophyllum sections found in the Americas.

== Description ==
Species in this section have unifoliate pseudobulbs, inflorescence with a thin rachis holding flowers that are distichously arranged. Lateral sepals totally free, petals erect. Column foot with entire apex and shorter than the length of the column.

== Distribution ==
Plants from this section are found in Brazil, Argentina, and Venezuela.

== Species ==
Bulbophyllum section Napelli comprises the following species:

Image	Name	Distribution	Elevation (m)
	Bulbophyllum atropurpureum Barb. Rodr. 1877	Brazil	300 metres (980 ft)
	Bulbophyllum bohnkeanum Campacci 2008	Brazil (Bahia)	700 metres (2,300 ft)
	Bulbophyllum boudetianum Fraga 2004	Brazil	
	Bulbophyllum calimanianum V.P.Castro & G.F.Carr 2007	Brazil	1,000–1,200 metres (3,300–3,900 ft)
	Bulbophyllum campos-portoi Brade 1951	Brazil (Minas Gerais and Espirito Santo)	1,000–1,500 metres (3,300–4,900 ft)
	Bulbophyllum cantagallense (Barb.Rodr.) Cogn. 1902	Brazil	500–700 metres (1,600–2,300 ft)
	Bulbophyllum cogniauxianum (Kraenzl.) J.J.Sm. 1912	Brazil	
	Bulbophyllum dunstervillei Garay 1976	Venezuela	
	Bulbophyllum glutinosum (Barb.Rodr.) Cogn. 1902	Brazil (Minas Gerais and Espirito Santo)	1,300–1,600 metres (4,300–5,200 ft)
	Bulbophyllum granulosum Barb.Rodr. 1877	Brazil	500–1,500 metres (1,600–4,900 ft)
	Bulbophyllum kautskyi Toscano 2000	Brazil (Bahia and Espirito Santo)	650–800 metres (2,130–2,620 ft)
	Bulbophyllum malachadenia Cogn. 1902	Brazil (Sao Paulo and Rio de Janeiro )	100–500 metres (330–1,640 ft)
	Bulbophyllum micropetaliforme Leite 1946	Brazil	1,000–1,600 metres (3,300–5,200 ft)
	Bulbophyllum napellii Lindl. 1842	Brazil	300–1,400 metres (980–4,590 ft)
	Bulbophyllum regnellii Rchb. f. 1849	southeastern Brazil	1,500 metres (4,900 ft)
	Bulbophyllum seabrense Campacci 2008	Brazil	1,000 metres (3,300 ft)
