= Bulbophyllum setigerum =

Scientific classification
- Kingdom: Plantae
- Clade: Tracheophytes
- Clade: Angiosperms
- Clade: Monocots
- Order: Asparagales
- Family: Orchidaceae
- Subfamily: Epidendroideae
- Genus: Bulbophyllum
- Subgenus: Bulbophyllum sect. Furvescentia
- Species: B. setigerum

Binomial name
- Bulbophyllum setigerum Lindl. 1838

Synonyms
- Phyllorkis setigera (Lindl.) Kuntze 1891; Bulbophyllum correae Pabst 1972

Species of orchid

Bulbophyllum setigerum is a species of orchid in the genus Bulbophyllum found in Brazil, Guyana, and Venezuela.
