= Bulbophyllum quadrisetum =

Scientific classification
- Kingdom: Plantae
- Clade: Tracheophytes
- Clade: Angiosperms
- Clade: Monocots
- Order: Asparagales
- Family: Orchidaceae
- Subfamily: Epidendroideae
- Genus: Bulbophyllum
- Subgenus: Bulbophyllum sect. Furvescentia
- Species: B. quadrisetum

Binomial name
- Bulbophyllum quadrisetum Lindl. 1843

Synonyms
- Phyllorkis quadriseta (Lindl.) Kuntze 1891

Species of orchid

Bulbophyllum quadrisetum is a species of orchid in the genus Bulbophyllum found in Guyana, French Guiana, and Suriname.
