= Bulbophyllum sect. Furvescentia =

Scientific classification
- Kingdom: Plantae
- Clade: Tracheophytes
- Clade: Angiosperms
- Clade: Monocots
- Order: Asparagales
- Family: Orchidaceae
- Subfamily: Epidendroideae
- Genus: Bulbophyllum
- Subgenus: Bulbophyllum sect. Furvescentia; E C Schmidt, Borba & Vandenburg 2011

Type species
- Bulbophyllum nagelii

Species
- See text

Section of flowering plants

Bulbophyllum sect. Furvescentia is a section of the genus Bulbophyllum. It is one of six Bulbophyllum sections found in the Americas.

== Description ==
Species in this section have unifoliate pseudobulbs, inflorescence with fleshy a rachis holding flowers that are spirally arranged. Lateral sepals totally free, petals erect. Column foot with entire apex and shorter than the length of the column.

== Distribution ==
Plants from this section are found in Brazil, Ecuador, French Guiana, Guyana, Mexico, Peru, Suriname, and Venezuela.

== Species ==
Bulbophyllum section Furvescentia comprises the following species:

Image	Name	Distribution	Elevation (m)
	Bulbophyllum meristorhachis Garay & Dunst. 1976	Venezuela	
	Bulbophyllum nagelii L.O.Williams 1939	Mexico	2,000–2,200 metres (6,600–7,200 ft)
	Bulbophyllum quadrisetum Lindl. 1843	Guyana, French Guiana, Suriname	
	Bulbophyllum setigerum Lindl. 1838	Brazil, Guyana, Venezuela	100–200 metres (330–660 ft)
	Bulbophyllum steyermarkii Foldats 1968	Venezuela, Colombia, Peru and Ecuador	1,200–2,800 metres (3,900–9,200 ft)
