= Bulbophyllum steyermarkii =

Scientific classification
- Kingdom: Plantae
- Clade: Tracheophytes
- Clade: Angiosperms
- Clade: Monocots
- Order: Asparagales
- Family: Orchidaceae
- Subfamily: Epidendroideae
- Genus: Bulbophyllum
- Subgenus: Bulbophyllum sect. Furvescentia
- Species: B. steyermarkii

Binomial name
- Bulbophyllum steyermarkii Foldats 1968

Synonyms
- Bulbophyllum bracteosum C.Schweinf. 1970

Species of orchid

Bulbophyllum steyermarkii is a species of orchid in the genus Bulbophyllum found in Venezuela, Colombia, Peru and Ecuador.
