= Bulbophyllum meristorhachis =

Scientific classification
- Kingdom: Plantae
- Clade: Tracheophytes
- Clade: Angiosperms
- Clade: Monocots
- Order: Asparagales
- Family: Orchidaceae
- Subfamily: Epidendroideae
- Genus: Bulbophyllum
- Subgenus: Bulbophyllum sect. Furvescentia
- Species: B. meristorhachis

Binomial name
- Bulbophyllum meristorhachis Garay & Dunst.

Species of orchid

Bulbophyllum meristorhachis is a species of flowering plant in the family Orchidaceae from Venezuela.
