= Bulbophyllum campos-portoi =

Scientific classification
- Kingdom: Plantae
- Clade: Tracheophytes
- Clade: Angiosperms
- Clade: Monocots
- Order: Asparagales
- Family: Orchidaceae
- Subfamily: Epidendroideae
- Genus: Bulbophyllum
- Species: B. campos-portoi

Binomial name
- Bulbophyllum campos-portoi Brade

Species of orchid

Bulbophyllum campos-portoi is a species of flowering plant in the orchid family, Orchidaceae. It is endemic to Southeast Brazil.
