= Bulbophyllum nagelii =

Scientific classification
- Kingdom: Plantae
- Clade: Tracheophytes
- Clade: Angiosperms
- Clade: Monocots
- Order: Asparagales
- Family: Orchidaceae
- Subfamily: Epidendroideae
- Genus: Bulbophyllum
- Subgenus: Bulbophyllum sect. Furvescentia
- Species: B. nagelii

Binomial name
- Bulbophyllum nagelii L. O. Williams 1939

Species of orchid

Bulbophyllum nagelii is a species of orchid in the genus Bulbophyllum found in Mexico.
