= Bulbophyllum cogniauxianum =

Scientific classification
- Kingdom: Plantae
- Clade: Tracheophytes
- Clade: Angiosperms
- Clade: Monocots
- Order: Asparagales
- Family: Orchidaceae
- Subfamily: Epidendroideae
- Genus: Bulbophyllum
- Species: B. cogniauxianum

Binomial name
- Bulbophyllum cogniauxianum (Kraenzl.) J.J.Sm. 1912

Synonyms
- Cirrhopetalum cogniauxianum Kraenzl. 1905

Species of orchid

Bulbophyllum cogniauxianum is a species of orchid in the genus Bulbophyllum found in Brazil.

== Description ==
The rhizome thin, the bulbs are fairly distant from each other, conical, subterete, with a 2 cm high base and 1 cm thick monophylls. Leaves unifoliate at the base short-petiolate linear-oblong obtuse apex bilobed thick coriaceous 6-7 cm long 1-1.3 cm wide, scape with thin sheaths short, apex bearing a umbel with few flowers(3-6), minute lanceolate bracts scarcely shorter than the short ovaries. scarcely connate, pointed, carinate in the middle, with a small curved triangular label above the furrowed base, and on both sides slightly auricled anteriorly, not produced in the process: the foot of the column is very curved and arched. Column short not brachiate, stele short sharp, androclinium deeply excavated Flowers dirty purple, dorsal sepal 4 mm, petals 3.5 mm long, dorsal sepal 3 mm, petals 1.5-2 mm wide, lateral sepals 1 cm long 2 mm wide, labellum 1.25 mm long.
