= Bulbophyllum micropetaliforme =

Scientific classification
- Kingdom: Plantae
- Clade: Tracheophytes
- Clade: Angiosperms
- Clade: Monocots
- Order: Asparagales
- Family: Orchidaceae
- Subfamily: Epidendroideae
- Genus: Bulbophyllum
- Species: B. micropetaliforme

Binomial name
- Bulbophyllum micropetaliforme Leite

Synonyms
- Bulbophyllum cribbianum Toscano 1992; Bulbophyllum micropetalum Barb.Rodr. 1881

Species of orchid

Bulbophyllum micropetaliforme is a species of orchid in the genus Bulbophyllum.
