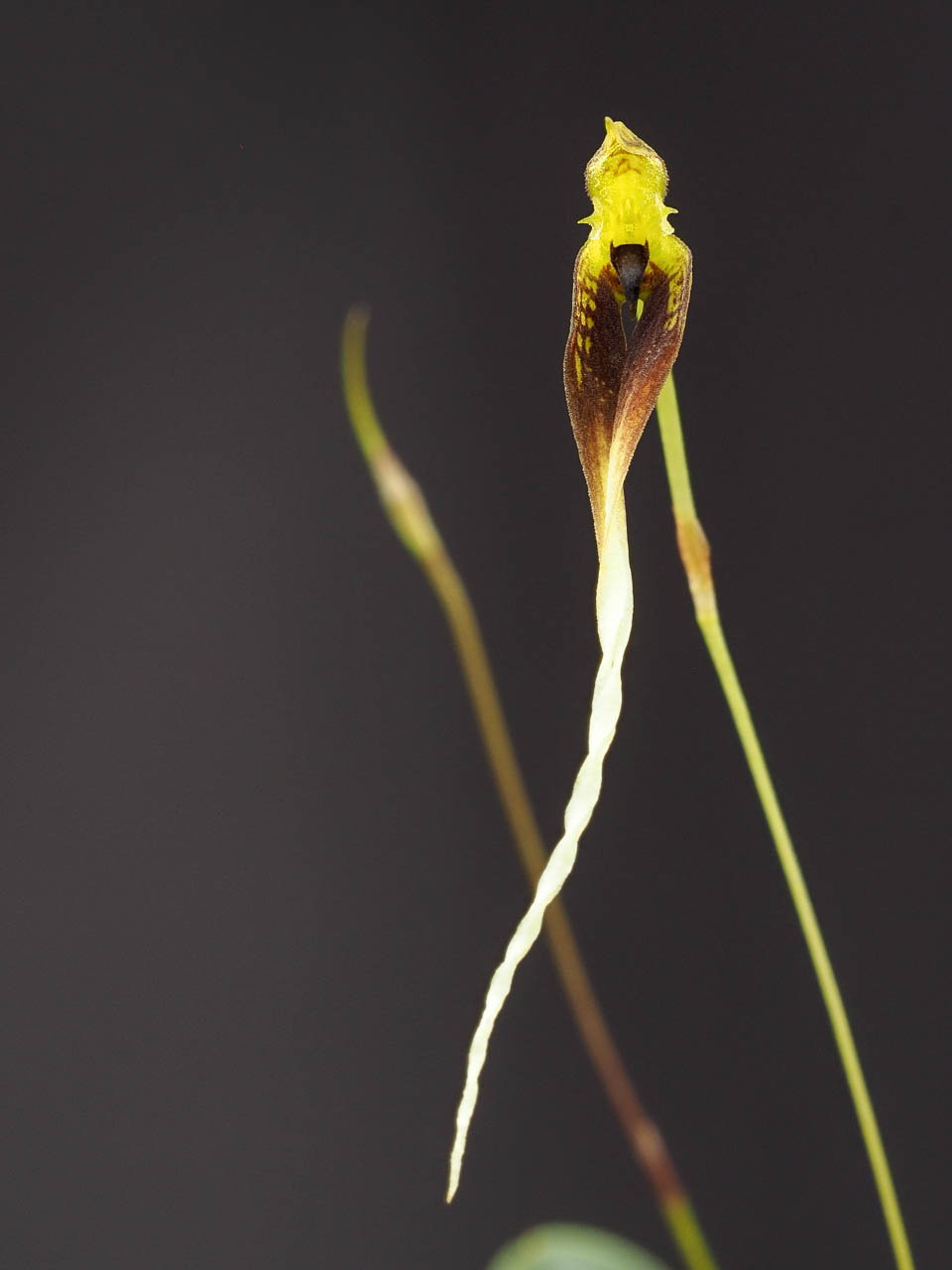
- Bulbophyllum contortisepalum

Scientific classification
- Kingdom: Plantae
- Clade: Tracheophytes
- Clade: Angiosperms
- Clade: Monocots
- Order: Asparagales
- Family: Orchidaceae
- Subfamily: Epidendroideae
- Genus: Bulbophyllum
- Section: Bulbophyllum sect. Hoplandra; J.J. Verm. 2008

Type species
- Bulbophyllum restrepia Ridl. 1893

Species
- See text

= Bulbophyllum sect. Hoplandra =

Section of flowering plants

Bulbophyllum sect. Hoplandra is a section of the genus Bulbophyllum.

== Description ==
Species in this section have basal node of the pedicel is level to above the attachment of the floral bract.

== Distribution ==
Plants from this section are found from Papua New Guinea to Southeast Asia.

== Species ==
Bulbophyllum section Hoplandra comprises the following species:

Image	Name	Distribution	Elevation (m)
	Bulbophyllum baladeanum J.J.Sm. 1912	New Caledonia	1,100 metres (3,600 ft)
	Bulbophyllum chthonochroma J.J.Verm. & Sieder 2015	Papua New Guinea	
	Bulbophyllum contortisepalum J.J. Sm. 1912	New Guinea	50–1,500 metres (160–4,920 ft)
	Bulbophyllum diplohelix J.J.Verm. & Rysy 2014	western New Guinea	
	Bulbophyllum drepananthum J.J.Verm., de Vogel & A.Vogel 2010	Bismarck Archipelago	350–400 metres (1,150–1,310 ft)
	Bulbophyllum drepanosepalum J.J.Verm. & P.O'Byrne 1993	Papua New Guinea	800 metres (2,600 ft)
	Bulbophyllum falciferum J.J. Sm. 1910	New Guinea, the Solomon Islands and Vanuatu	50–1,209 metres (164–3,967 ft)
	Bulbophyllum freitagii Jenny 2019	New Guinea	
	Bulbophyllum himantosepalum J.J.Verm. & Sieder 2015	Papua New Guinea	
	Bulbophyllum inaequisepalum Schltr. 1923	Papua New Guinea	
	Bulbophyllum irianae de Vogel, Suhartawan, Hoogend. & Heatubun 2018	western New Guinea	45–300 metres (148–984 ft)
	Bulbophyllum louisiadum Schltr. 1919	The Louisiade Archipelago of New Guinea	950 metres (3,120 ft)
	Bulbophyllum ngoyense Schltr. 1906	New Caledonia	900 metres (3,000 ft)
	Bulbophyllum obovatifolium J.J.Sm. 1912	New Guinea	200–300 metres (660–980 ft)
	Bulbophyllum potamophilum Schltr.1913	New Guinea	1,200 metres (3,900 ft)
	Bulbophyllum restrepia Ridl. 1893	Singapore, Johor and Pahang Malaysia	0–1,600 metres (0–5,249 ft)
