= Bulbophyllum baladeanum =

Scientific classification
- Kingdom: Plantae
- Clade: Tracheophytes
- Clade: Angiosperms
- Clade: Monocots
- Order: Asparagales
- Family: Orchidaceae
- Subfamily: Epidendroideae
- Genus: Bulbophyllum
- Species: B. baladeanum

Binomial name
- Bulbophyllum baladeanum J.J.Sm.

Synonyms
- Bulbophyllum leratiae Seidenf.; Cirrhopetalum leratiae Kraenzl.; Cirrhopetalum uniflorum Schltr.

Species of orchid

Bulbophyllum baladeanum is a species of orchid in the genus Bulbophyllum. It is a pseudobulbous epiphyte endemic to New Caledonia.
