= Bulbophyllum sulfureum =

Scientific classification
- Kingdom: Plantae
- Clade: Tracheophytes
- Clade: Angiosperms
- Clade: Monocots
- Order: Asparagales
- Family: Orchidaceae
- Subfamily: Epidendroideae
- Genus: Bulbophyllum
- Section: Bulbophyllum sect. Alcistachys
- Species: B. sulfureum

Binomial name
- Bulbophyllum sulfureum Schltr.

Synonyms
- Bulbophyllum brevipetalum subsp. majus H.Perrier 1937

Species of orchid

Bulbophyllum sulfureum is a species of orchid in the genus Bulbophyllum found in Madagascar.
