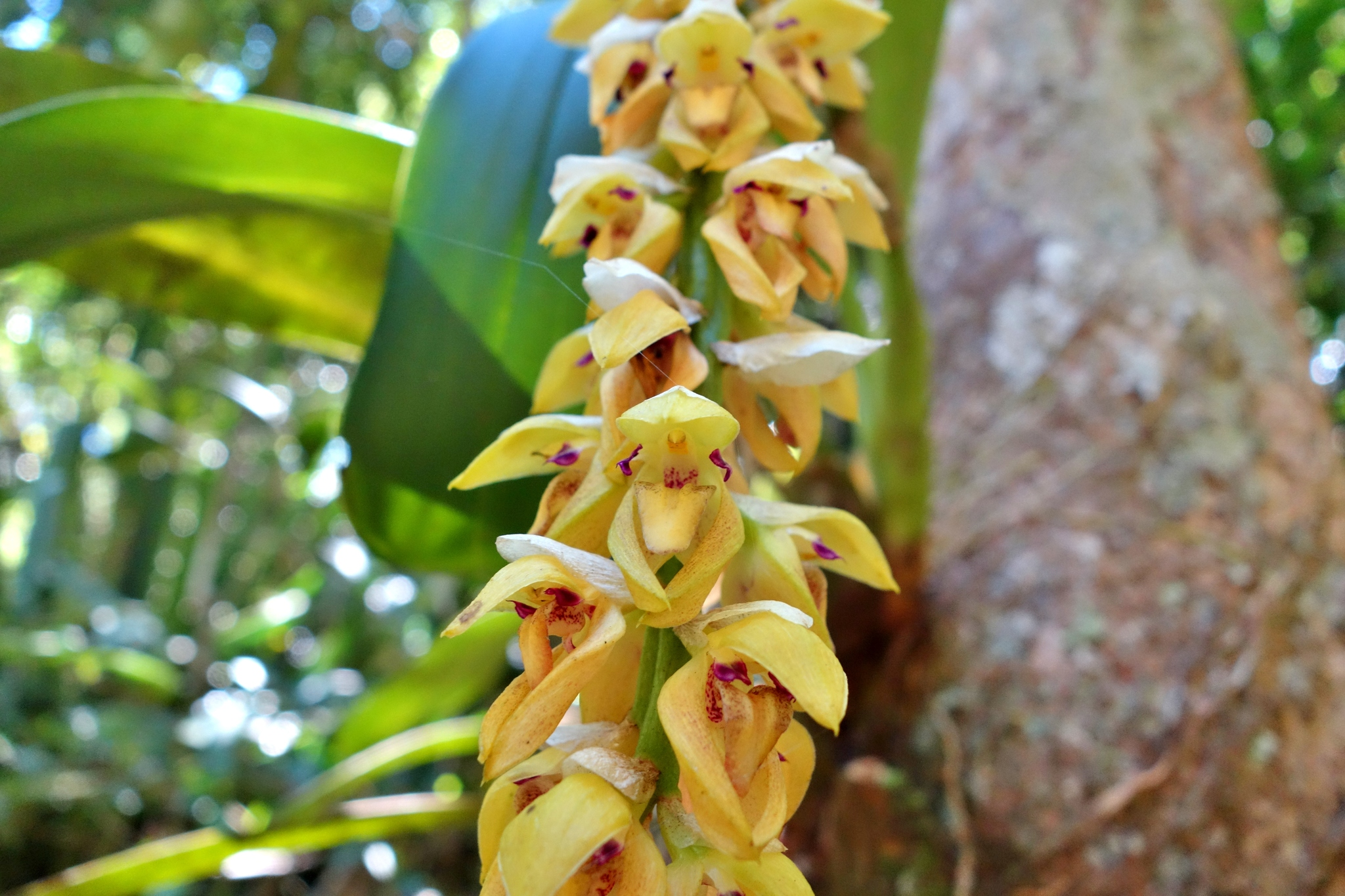
- Bulbophyllum occlusum

Scientific classification
- Kingdom: Plantae
- Clade: Tracheophytes
- Clade: Angiosperms
- Clade: Monocots
- Order: Asparagales
- Family: Orchidaceae
- Subfamily: Epidendroideae
- Genus: Bulbophyllum
- Section: Bulbophyllum sect. Alcistachys; Schltr.

Type species
- Bulbophyllum occlusum

Species
- See text

= Bulbophyllum sect. Alcistachys =

Section of flowering plants

Bulbophyllum sect. Alcistachys is a section of the genus Bulbophyllum.

== Description ==
Species in this section is are rhizomatus with one to two leaves on the pseudobulb blooming with a racemose of flowers with bracts.

== Distribution ==
Plants from this section are found in Madagascar.

== Species ==
Bulbophyllum section Alcistachys comprises the following species:

| Image | Name | Distribution | Elevation (m) |
|---|---|---|---|
| | Bulbophyllum bathieanum Schltr. 1916 | Madagascar | 500–1,400 metres (1,600–4,600 ft) |
| | Bulbophyllum hamelinii W.Watson 1893 | Madagascar | 800–1,000 metres (2,600–3,300 ft) |
| | Bulbophyllum occlusum Ridl. 1885 | Madagascar | 600–2,000 metres (2,000–6,600 ft) |
| | Bulbophyllum sulfureum Schlechter 1924 | Madagascar | 800–1,700 metres (2,600–5,600 ft) |
| | Bulbophyllum variegatum Thouars 1822 | Madagascar, Mauritius, and Reunion | 0–1,200 metres (0–3,937 ft) |
