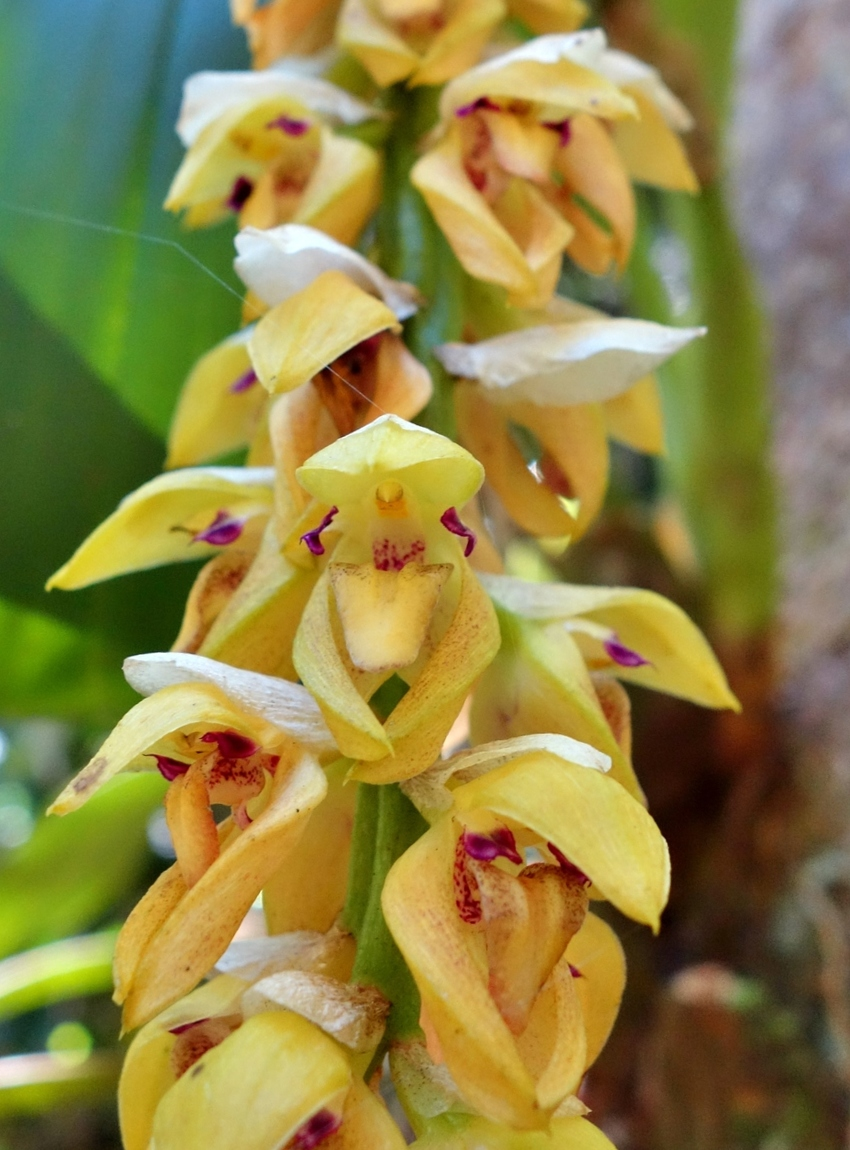

Scientific classification
- Kingdom: Plantae
- Clade: Tracheophytes
- Clade: Angiosperms
- Clade: Monocots
- Order: Asparagales
- Family: Orchidaceae
- Subfamily: Epidendroideae
- Genus: Bulbophyllum
- Section: Bulbophyllum sect. Alcistachys
- Species: B. occlusum

Binomial name
- Bulbophyllum occlusum Ridl.

Synonyms
- Phyllorkis occlusa (Ridl.) Kuntze 1891

= Bulbophyllum occlusum =

Species of orchid

Bulbophyllum occlusum is a species of orchid in the genus Bulbophyllum found in Madagascar.
