= Bulbophyllum variegatum =

Scientific classification
- Kingdom: Plantae
- Clade: Tracheophytes
- Clade: Angiosperms
- Clade: Monocots
- Order: Asparagales
- Family: Orchidaceae
- Subfamily: Epidendroideae
- Genus: Bulbophyllum
- Section: Bulbophyllum sect. Alcistachys
- Species: B. variegatum

Binomial name
- Bulbophyllum variegatum Thouars

Synonyms
- Phyllorkis variegata (Thouars) Kuntze 1891; Phyllorkis variephylis Thouars 1822; Phyllorkis variphylis Thouars 1822

Species of orchid

Bulbophyllum variegatum is a species of orchid in the genus Bulbophyllum found in Madagascar.
