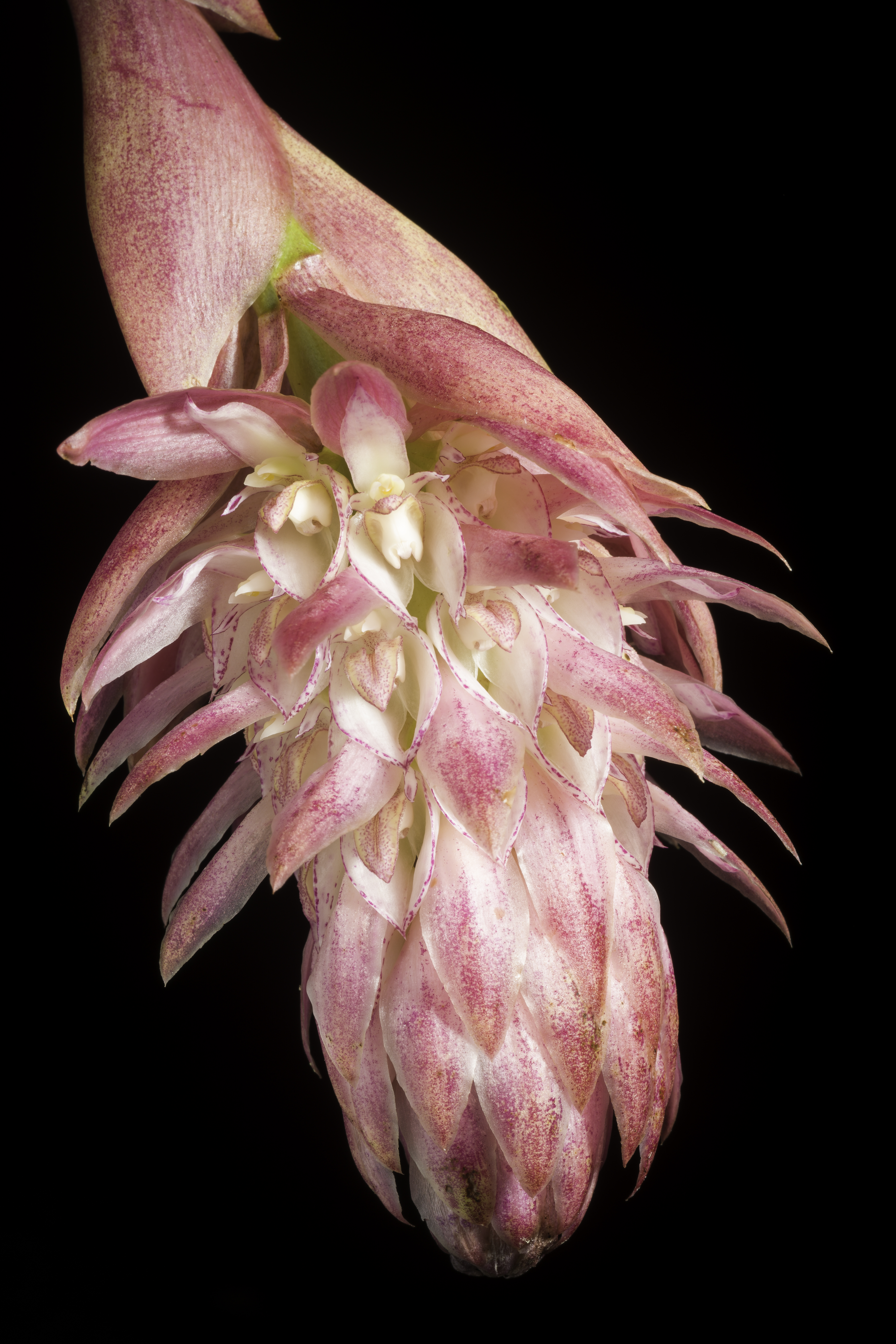

Scientific classification
- Kingdom: Plantae
- Clade: Tracheophytes
- Clade: Angiosperms
- Clade: Monocots
- Order: Asparagales
- Family: Orchidaceae
- Subfamily: Epidendroideae
- Genus: Bulbophyllum
- Section: Bulbophyllum sect. Alcistachys
- Species: B. hamelinii

Binomial name
- Bulbophyllum hamelinii W.Watson

= Bulbophyllum hamelinii =

Species of orchid

Bulbophyllum hamelinii is a species of orchid in the genus Bulbophyllum found in Madagascar.
