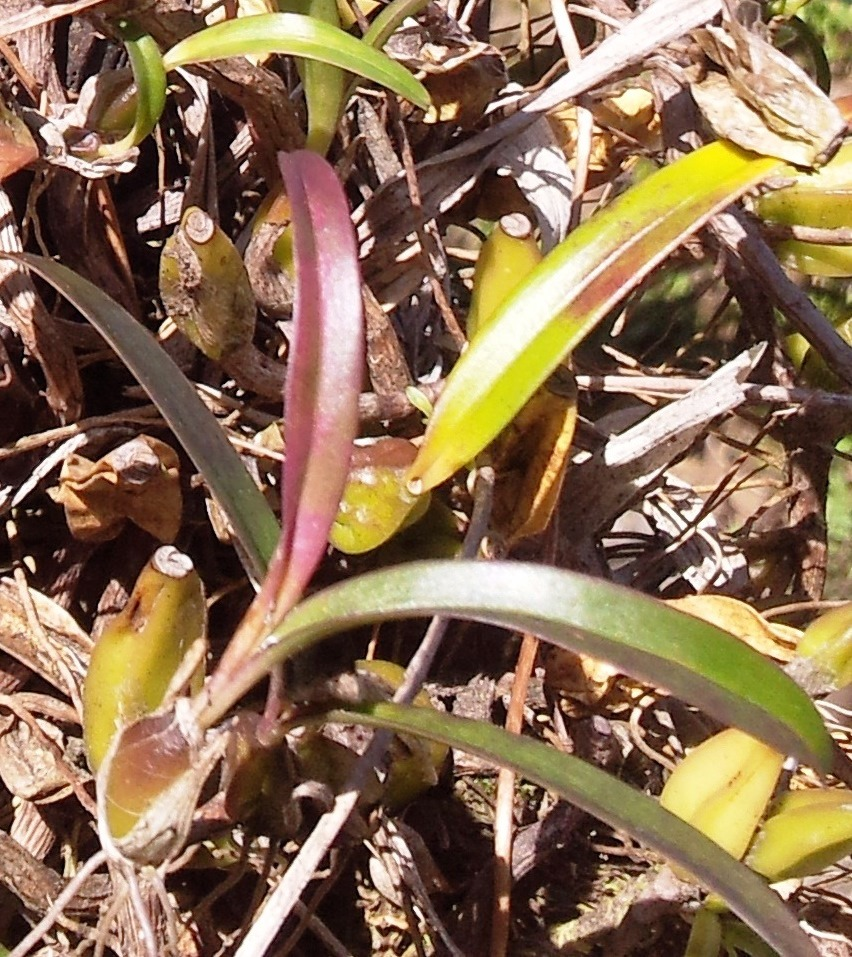

Scientific classification
- Kingdom: Plantae
- Clade: Tracheophytes
- Clade: Angiosperms
- Clade: Monocots
- Order: Asparagales
- Family: Orchidaceae
- Subfamily: Epidendroideae
- Genus: Bulbophyllum
- Species: B. caespitosum

Binomial name
- Bulbophyllum caespitosum Thouars

= Bulbophyllum caespitosum =

Species of orchid

Bulbophyllum caespitosum is a species of orchid in the genus Bulbophyllum from Mauritius and Reunion.
