= Bulbophyllum gracile =

Scientific classification
- Kingdom: Plantae
- Clade: Tracheophytes
- Clade: Angiosperms
- Clade: Monocots
- Order: Asparagales
- Family: Orchidaceae
- Subfamily: Epidendroideae
- Genus: Bulbophyllum
- Species: B. gracile

Binomial name
- Bulbophyllum gracile Thouars

Synonyms
- Bulbophyllum thouarsii Steud.; Phyllorchis gracilis Kuntze

Species of orchid

Bulbophyllum gracile is a species of orchid in the genus Bulbophyllum from Mauritius.
