= Bulbophyllum iners =

Scientific classification
- Kingdom: Plantae
- Clade: Tracheophytes
- Clade: Angiosperms
- Clade: Monocots
- Order: Asparagales
- Family: Orchidaceae
- Subfamily: Epidendroideae
- Genus: Bulbophyllum
- Species: B. iners

Binomial name
- Bulbophyllum iners Rchb. f.

Synonyms
- Phyllorkis iners (Rchb.f.) Kuntze 1891

Species of orchid

Bulbophyllum iners is a species of orchid in the genus Bulbophyllum found in Assam, India.
