= Bulbophyllum stenophyllum =

Scientific classification
- Kingdom: Plantae
- Clade: Tracheophytes
- Clade: Angiosperms
- Clade: Monocots
- Order: Asparagales
- Family: Orchidaceae
- Subfamily: Epidendroideae
- Genus: Bulbophyllum
- Species: B. stenophyllum

Binomial name
- Bulbophyllum stenophyllum C.S.P.Parish & Rchb.f. 1874

Species of orchid

Bulbophyllum stenophyllum is a species of orchid in the genus Bulbophyllum native to Laos.
