= Bulbophyllum luckraftii =

Scientific classification
- Kingdom: Plantae
- Clade: Tracheophytes
- Clade: Angiosperms
- Clade: Monocots
- Order: Asparagales
- Family: Orchidaceae
- Subfamily: Epidendroideae
- Genus: Bulbophyllum
- Species: B. luckraftii

Binomial name
- Bulbophyllum luckraftii F. Muell.

Species of orchid

Bulbophyllum luckraftii is a species of orchid in the genus Bulbophyllum from the Solomon Islands.
