= Bulbophyllum vittatum =

Scientific classification
- Kingdom: Plantae
- Clade: Tracheophytes
- Clade: Angiosperms
- Clade: Monocots
- Order: Asparagales
- Family: Orchidaceae
- Subfamily: Epidendroideae
- Genus: Bulbophyllum
- Species: B. vittatum

Binomial name
- Bulbophyllum vittatum Teijsm. & Binn. 1862

Species of orchid

Bulbophyllum vittatum is a species of orchid in the genus Bulbophyllum from Jawa.
