= List of the orchids of the Philippines =

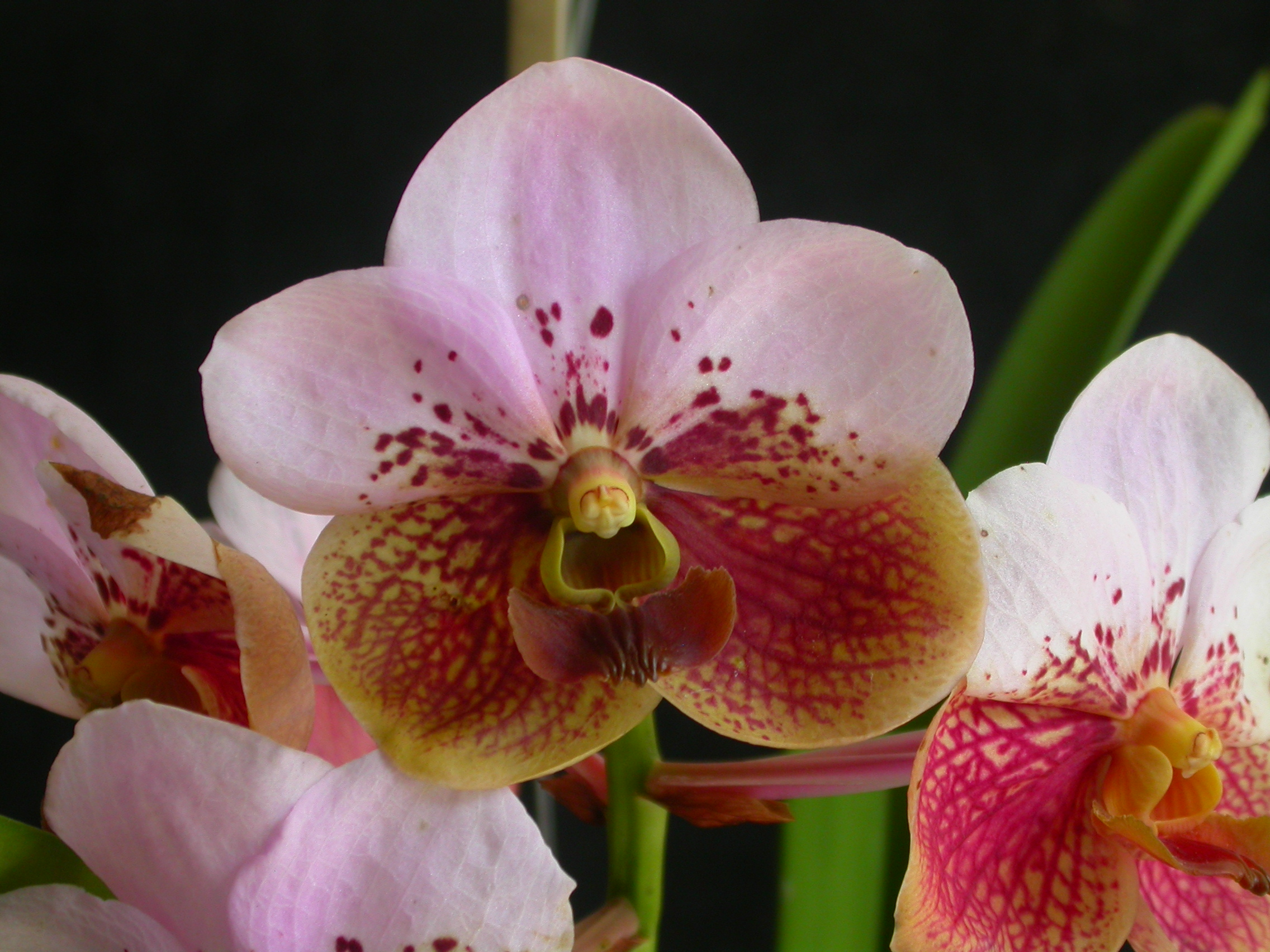
Vanda sanderiana, considered as the "Queen of Philippine Flowers"

There are about 141 genera of orchids representing about 1,100 orchid species, 900 of which are described as endemic to the Philippines. Many of them have showy, brightly colored and attractive flowers.

Vanda sanderiana is unofficially dubbed the National Flower, as the only representative of the species is unique to the Philippines and is only found on the island of Mindanao.

== Abdominea ==
- Abdominea minimiflora

== Acampe ==
- Acampe rigida

== Acanthophippium ==
- Acanthophippium mantinianum endemic to the Philippines
- Acanthophippium sylhetense

== Acriopsis ==
- Acriopsis indica
- Acriopsis liliiflolia

== Aerides ==
Species of Aerides are known for their showy, often fragrant flowers. In the Philippines, members of the genus are further distinguished by their fleshy spurs.

- Aerides augustiana — endemic to the Philippines
- Aerides inflexa
- Aerides lawrenceae — endemic to the Philippines
- Aerides leeana — endemic to the Philippines
- Aerides magnifica
- Aerides migueldavidii
- Aerides odorata
- Aerides quinquevulnera
- Aerides roebelenii
- Aerides savageana — endemic to the Philippines
- Aerides shibatiana

== Agrostophyllum ==
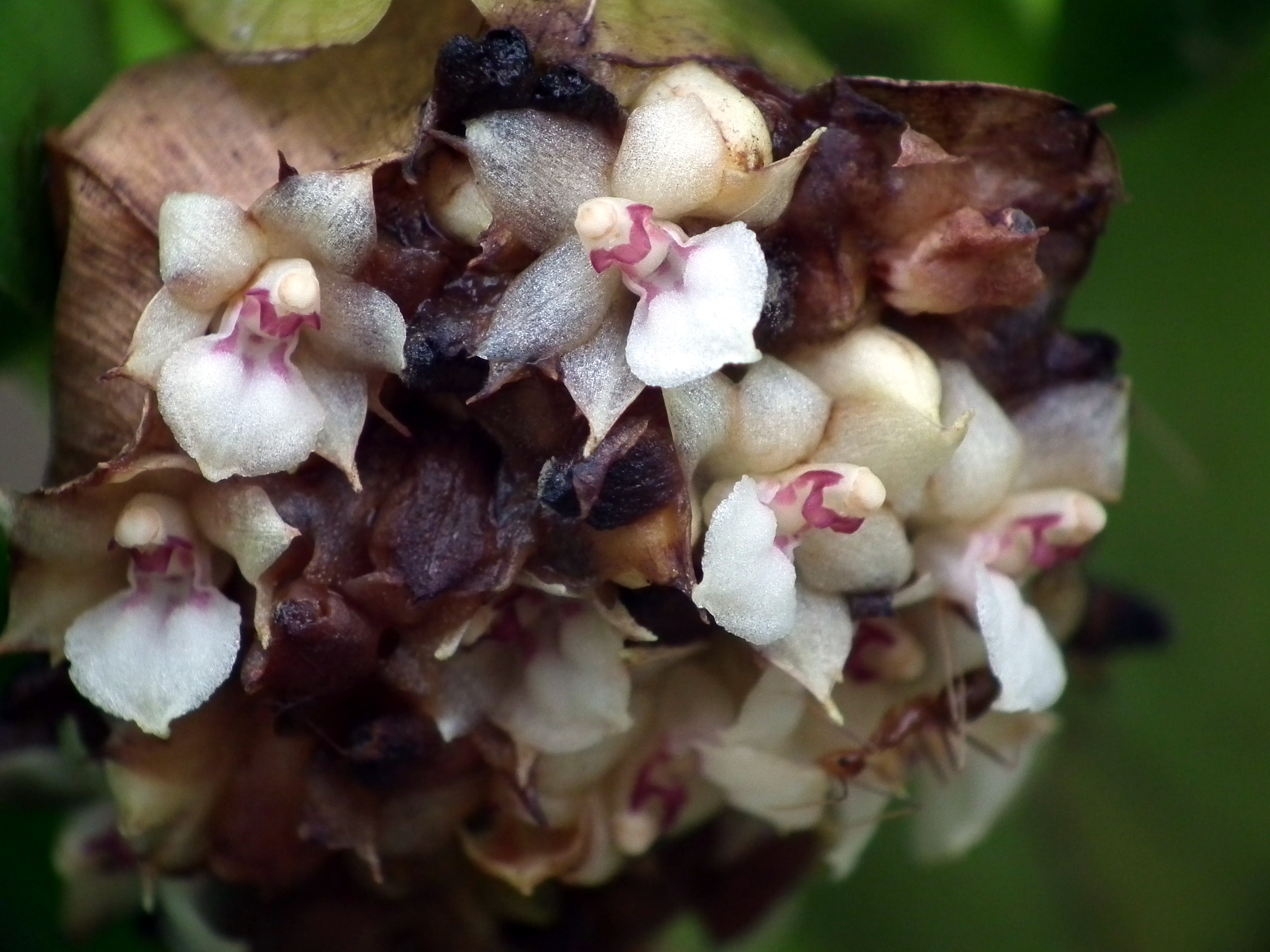
Agrostophyllum philippinense

- Agrostophyllum elmeri endemic to the Philippines
- Agrostophyllum elongatum
- Agrostophyllum inocephalum
- Agrostophyllum leytense endemic to the Philippines
- Agrostophyllum longivaginatum endemic to the Philippines
- Agrostophyllum luzonense endemic to the Philippines
- Agrostophyllum malindangense endemic to the Philippines
- Agrostophyllum mearnsii
- Agrostophyllum merrillii endemic to the Philippines
- Agrostophyllum mindanaense endemic to the Philippines
- Agrostophyllum philippinense endemic to the Philippines
- Agrostophyllum planicaule
- Agrostophyllum saccatilabium endemic to the Philippines
- Agrostophyllum stipulatum
- Agrostophyllum wenzelii

== Amesiella ==
- Amesiella minor endemic to the Philippines
- Amesiella monticola endemic to the Philippines
- Amesiella philippinensis endemic to the Philippines

== Aphyllorchis ==
- Aphyllorchis halconensis endemic to the Philippines
- Aphyllorchis montana
- Aphyllorchis pallida

== Apostasia ==
- Apostasia nuda
- Apostasia wallichii

== Appendicula ==
- Appendicula alba
- Appendicula anceps
- Appendicula buxifolia
- Appendicula clemensiae
- Appendicula cornuta
- Appendicula crotalina
- Appendicula cuneata
- Appendicula elmeri
- Appendicula fenixii
- Appendicula irigensis endemic to the Philippines
- Appendicula laxifolia
- Appendicula leytensis
- Appendicula lucbanensis
- Appendicula luzonsensis
- Appendicula malindangensis
- Appendicula maquilingensis endemic to the Philippines
- Appendicula merrillii endemic to the Philippines
- Appendicula negrosiana
- Appendicula pendula
- Appendicula perplexa
- Appendicula polyantha
- Appendicula reflexa
- Appendicula tagalensium
- Appendicula tembuyukenensis
- Appendicula torta
- Appendicula undulata
- Appendicula weberi
- Appendicula xytriophora

== Arachnis ==
- Arachnis breviscapa
- Arachnis flos-aeris
- Arachnis longicaulis

== Arundina ==
- Arundina graminifolia

== Ascidieria ==
- Ascidieria cymbidifolia
- Ascidieria palawanensis
- Ascidieria zamboangensis

== Ascochilus ==
- Ascochilus emarginatus
- Ascochilus leytensis
- Ascochilus mindanaensis
- Ascochilus siamensis

== Ascoglossum ==
- Ascoglossum calopterum

== Bogoria ==
- Bogoria merrillii

== Brachypeza ==
- Brachypeza zamboangensis

== Bromheadia ==
- Bromheadia alticola
- Bromheadia devogelii
- Bromheadia finlaysoniana

== Bulbophyllum ==
- Bulbophyllum abbreviatum
- Bulbophyllum absconditum
- Bulbophyllum aeolium
- Bulbophyllum aestivale
- Bulbophyllum alagense
- Bulbophyllum alboroseum
- Bulbophyllum alsiosum
- Bulbophyllum antenniferum
- Bulbophyllum amplebracteatum
- Bulbophyllum anascaputum
- Bulbophyllum apertum
- Bulbophyllum apodum
- Bulbophyllum apoense
- Bulbophyllum arrectum
- Bulbophyllum auratum
- Bulbophyllum basisetum
- Bulbophyllum bataanense
- Bulbophyllum baucoense
- Bulbophyllum biflorum
- Bulbophyllum bolsteri
- Bulbophyllum bontocense
- Bulbophyllum brevibrachiatum
- Bulbophyllum brienianum
- Bulbophyllum calophyllum
- Bulbophyllum canlaonense
- Bulbophyllum carunculatum
- Bulbophyllum catenulatum
- Bulbophyllum cephalophorum
- Bulbophyllum cheiri
- Bulbophyllum chrysendetum
- Bulbophyllum chryseum
- Bulbophyllum clandestinum
- Bulbophyllum cleistogamum
- Bulbophyllum clemensiae
- Bulbophyllum colubrimodum
- Bulbophyllum cootesii
- Bulbophyllum cornutum
- Bulbophyllum cryptophoranthus
- Bulbophyllum cubicum
- Bulbophyllum cumingii
- Bulbophyllum cuneatum
- Bulbophyllum cupreum
- Bulbophyllum curranii
- Bulbophyllum dasypetalum
- Bulbophyllum dearei
- Bulbophyllum debrincatiae
- Bulbophyllum depressum
- Bulbophyllum dissolutum
- Bulbophyllum dolichoblepharon
- Bulbophyllum doryphoroide
- Bulbophyllum ebracteolatum
- Bulbophyllum echinochilum
- Bulbophyllum ecornutoides
- Bulbophyllum elassoglossum
- Bulbophyllum elmeri
- Bulbophyllum elongatum
- Bulbophyllum erosimarginatum
- Bulbophyllum erosipetalum
- Bulbophyllum erratum
- Bulbophyllum escritorii
- Bulbophyllum exile
- Bulbophyllum exquisitum
- Bulbophyllum facetum
- Bulbophyllum fascinator
- Bulbophyllum fenixii
- Bulbophyllum flavescens
- Bulbophyllum gerlandianum
- Bulbophyllum gilvum
- Bulbophyllum gimagaanense
- Bulbophyllum glandulosum
- Bulbophyllum glebodactylum
- Bulbophyllum glebulosum
- Bulbophyllum gnomoniferum
- Bulbophyllum goebelianum
- Bulbophyllum gusdorfii
- Bulbophyllum halconense
- Bulbophyllum inacootesiae
- Bulbophyllum inunctum
- Bulbophyllum invisum
- Bulbophyllum kittredgei
- Bulbophyllum lancifolium
- Bulbophyllum lancilabium
- Bulbophyllum lancipetalum
- Bulbophyllum lasioglossum
- Bulbophyllum lasiopetalum
- Bulbophyllum laxiflorum
- Bulbophyllum leibergii
- Bulbophyllum lemniscatoides
- Bulbophyllum lepantense
- Bulbophyllum leptocaulon
- Bulbophyllum levanae
- Bulbophyllum leytense
- Bulbophyllum lipense
- Bulbophyllum lobbii
- Bulbophyllum loherianum
- Bulbophyllum longiflorum
- Bulbophyllum longipetiolatum
- Bulbophyllum macranthum
- Bulbophyllum maculatum
- Bulbophyllum makoyanum
- Bulbophyllum maquilingense
- Bulbophyllum marivelense
- Bulbophyllum masaganapense
- Bulbophyllum maxillare
- Bulbophyllum mearnsii
- Bulbophyllum membranifolium
- Bulbophyllum merrittii
- Bulbophyllum migueldavidii
- Bulbophyllum mindorense
- Bulbophyllum mona-lisae
- Bulbophyllum monstrabile
- Bulbophyllum mucronatum
- Bulbophyllum mutabile
- Bulbophyllum nasseri
- Bulbophyllum negrosianum
- Bulbophyllum nemorale
- Bulbophyllum nymphopolitanum
- Bulbophyllum ocellatum
- Bulbophyllum odoratum
- Bulbophyllum orectopetalum
- Bulbophyllum orthoglossum
- Bulbophyllum othonis
- Bulbophyllum pampangense
- Bulbophyllum papillipetalum
- Bulbophyllum papulosum
- Bulbophyllum pardalotum
- Bulbophyllum pauciflorum
- Bulbophyllum penduliscapum
- Bulbophyllum peramoenum
- Bulbophyllum piestoglossum
- Bulbophyllum pleurothalloides
- Bulbophyllum plumatum
- Bulbophyllum pseudoconiferum
- Bulbophyllum puguahaanense
- Bulbophyllum putidum
- Bulbophyllum ravanii
- Bulbophyllum recurvilabre
- Bulbophyllum rhizomatosum
- Bulbophyllum romyi
- Bulbophyllum rugosum
- Bulbophyllum rysyanum
- Bulbophyllum santosii
- Bulbophyllum sapphirinum
- Bulbophyllum saurocephalum
- Bulbophyllum savaiense
  - sbsp. subcubicum
- Bulbophyllum schefferi
- Bulbophyllum sempiternum
- Bulbophyllum sensile
- Bulbophyllum serratotruncatum
- Bulbophyllum sibuyanense
- Bulbophyllum simulacrum
- Bulbophyllum socordine
- Bulbophyllum stellatum
- Bulbophyllum subaequale
- Bulbophyllum superfluum
- Bulbophyllum surigaense
- Bulbophyllum tenuifolium
- Bulbophyllum toppingii
- Bulbophyllum tortuosum
- Bulbophyllum trigonosepalum
- Bulbophyllum umbellatum
- Bulbophyllum unguiculatum
- Bulbophyllum uniflorum
- Bulbophyllum vagans
- Bulbophyllum vaginatum
- Bulbophyllum vermiculare
- Bulbophyllum vespertilio
- Bulbophyllum weberi
- Bulbophyllum whitfordii
- Bulbophyllum williamsii
- Bulbophyllum woelfliae
- Bulbophyllum zambalense
- Bulbophyllum zamboangense

== Calanthe ==
- Calanthe alba
- Calanthe angustifolia
- Calanthe conspicua
- Calanthe davaensis
- Calanthe halconensis
- Calanthe hennisii
- Calanthe jusnerii
- Calanthe lacerata
- Calanthe lyroglossa
- Calanthe maquilingensis
- Calanthe mcgregorii
- Calanthe mindorensis
- Calanthe nivalis
- Calanthe pulchra
- Calanthe rosea
- Calanthe rubens
- Calanthe speciosa
- Calanthe triplicata
- Calanthe vestita

== Cephalantheropsis ==
- Cephalantheropsis halconensis
- Cephalantheropsis longipes
- Cephalantheropsis obcordata

== Ceratocentron ==
- Ceratocentron fesseli endemic to the Philippines

== Ceratostylis ==
- Ceratostylis caespitosa
- Ceratostylis dataensis
- Ceratostylis elmeri
- Ceratostylis heterophylla
- Ceratostylis incognita
- Ceratostylis loheri
- Ceratostylis mindanaensis
- Ceratostylis philippinensis
- Ceratostylis ramosa
- Ceratostylis retisquama
- Ceratostylis senilis
- Ceratostylis subulata
- Ceratostylis wenzelii

== Chamaeanthus ==
- Chamaeanthus brachystachys
- Chamaeanthus wenzelii

== Cheirostylis ==
- Cheirostylis chinensis
- Cheirostylis merrillii
- Cheirostylis octodactyla

== Chelonistele ==
- Chelonistele sulphurea

== Chrysoglossum ==
- Chrysoglossum ornatum

== Claderia ==
- Claderia papuana

== Cleisostoma ==
- Cleisostoma chrysochilum
- Cleisostoma duplicilobum
- Cleisostoma sagittatum
- Cleisostoma striolatum
- Cleisostoma subulatum
- Cleisostoma uraiense
- Cleisostoma williamsonii

== Coelogyne ==
- Coelogyne alvinlokii endemic to the Philippines
- Coelogyne asperata
- Coelogyne bilamellata endemic to the Philippines
- Coelogyne candoonensis
- Coelogyne chloroptera endemic to the Philippines
- Coelogyne confusa endemic to the Philippines
- Coelogyne elmeri
- Coelogyne integerrima
- Coelogyne loheri
- Coelogyne longirachis
- Coelogyne marmorata endemic to the Philippines
- Coelogyne mayeriana
- Coelogyne merrillii endemic to the Philippines
- Coelogyne minutissima
- Coelogyne palawanensis
- Coelogyne pandurata
- Coelogyne prasina
- Coelogyne quinquelamellata endemic to the Philippines
- Coelogyne remediosae endemic to the Philippines
- Coelogyne rochussenii
- Coelogyne rubrolanata
- Coelogyne salvaneraniana endemic to the Philippines
- Coelogyne sparsa endemic to the Philippines
- Coelogyne sulcata
- Coelogyne swaniana
- Coelogyne usitana endemic to the Philippines
- Coelogyne vanoverberghii endemic to the Philippines
- Coelogyne zahlbrucknerae

== Collabium ==
- Collabium formosanum
- Collabium simplex

== Cordiglottis ==
- Cordiglottis filiformis

== Corybas ==
- Corybas merrillii
- Corybas laceratus
- Corybas ramosianus

== Corymborkis ==
- Corymborkis veratrifolia

== Crepidium ==
- Crepidium acuminatum
- Crepidium alagense
- Crepidium arietinum
- Crepidium atrosanguineum
- Crepidium balabacense
- Crepidium bancanoides
- Crepidium bataanense
- Crepidium binabayense
- Crepidium bracteosum
- Crepidium carinatum
- Crepidium copelandii
- Crepidium cuneipetalum
- Crepidium davaensis
- Crepidium dentatum
- Crepidium elmeri
- Crepidium epidendrum
- Crepidium hutchinsonianum
- Crepidium lilacinum
- Crepidium merrillii
- Crepidium mindorense
- Crepidium moluccanum, syn. Crepidium ramosii
- Crepidium negrosianum
- Crepidium propinquum
- Crepidium purpureiflorum
- Crepidium purpureum
- Crepidium quadridentatum
- Crepidium quadrilobium
- Crepidium taylorii
- Crepidium tjiwideiense
- Crepidium uncatum
- Crepidium wenzelii
- Crepidium williamsii

== Cryptostylis ==
- Cryptostylis acutata
- Cryptostylis arachnites
- Cryptostylis taiwaniana

== Cymbidium ==
- Cymbidium aliciae (Philippines)
- Cymbidium aloifolium
- Cymbidium atropurpureum
- Cymbidium bicolor
  - subsp. pubescens
- Cymbidium chloranthum
- Cymbidium cyperifolium
- Cymbidium dayanum
- Cymbidium ensifolium
- Cymbidium finlaysonianum
- Cymbidium lancifolium

== Cyrtosia ==
- Cyrtosia javanica

== Cystorchis ==
- Cystorchis aphylla
- Cystorchis javanica
- Cystorchis luzonensis

== Dendrobium ==
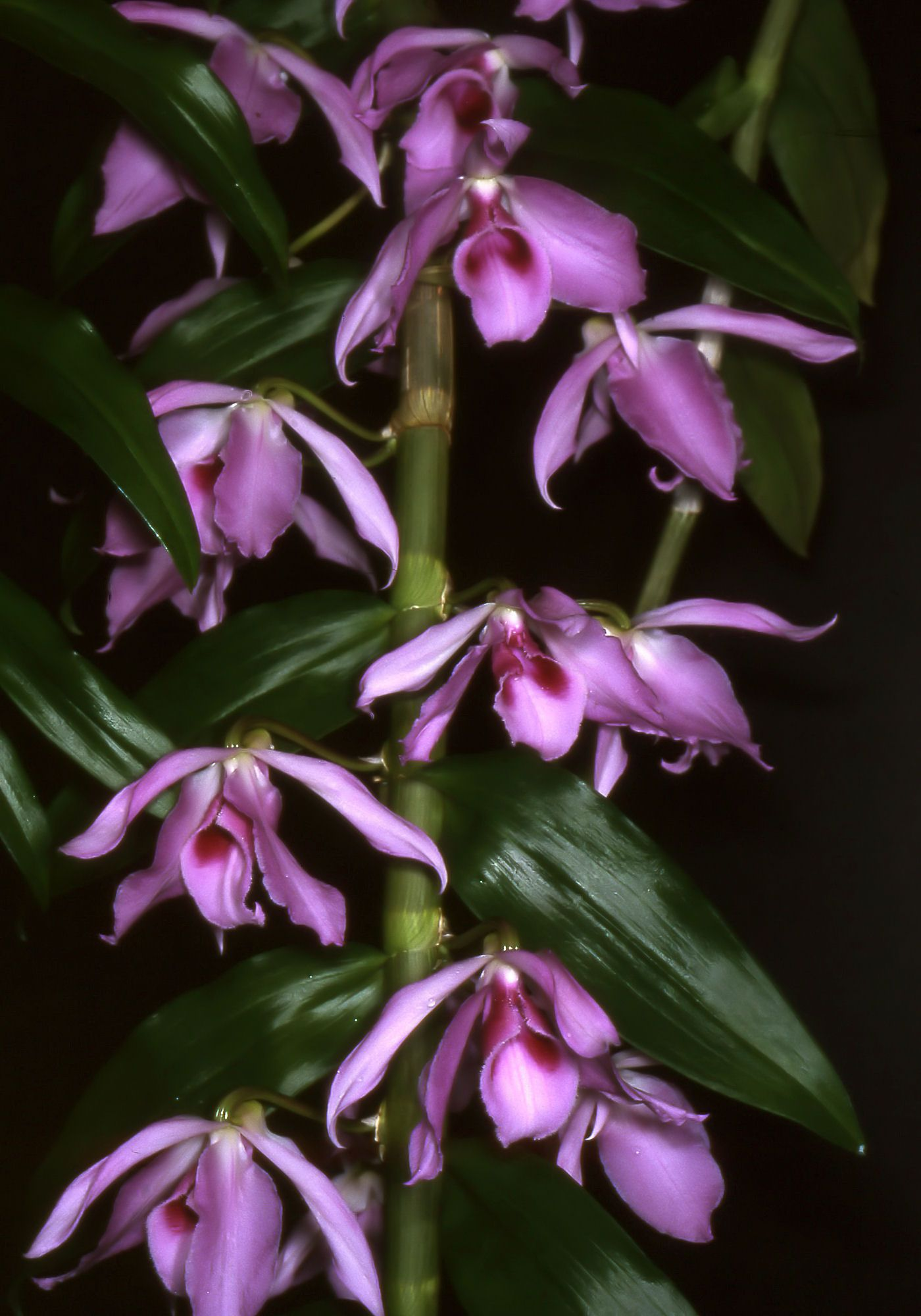
Dendrobium anosmum. Some specimen from the Philippines first described by Lindley are unscented. However, majority of the species are fragrant, giving the combined Tagalog term Sanggumay for its “repulsive” and “overpowering" scent.

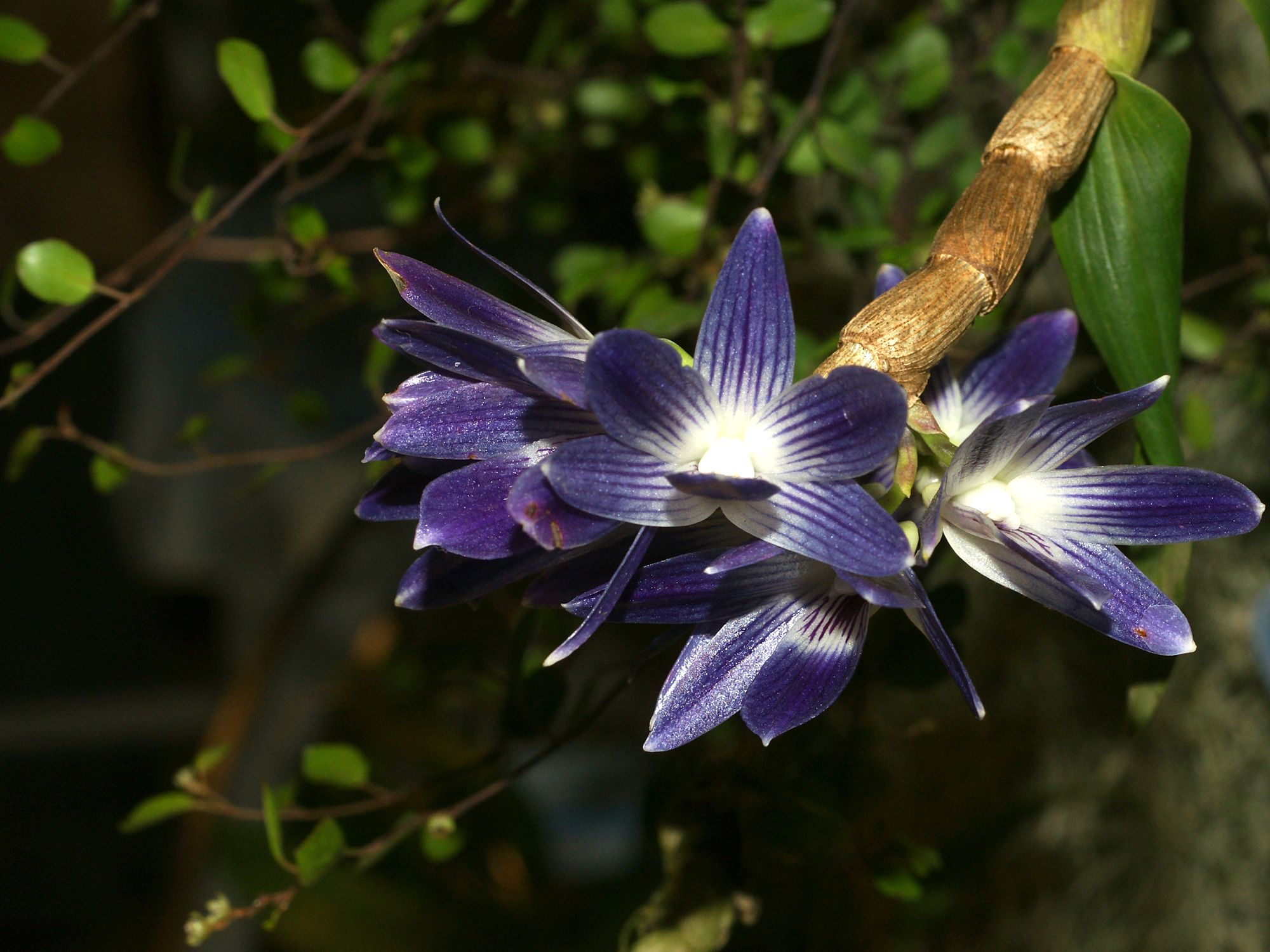
Dendrobium victoriae-reginae. Named after Queen Victoria, this species is endemic to the Philippines

- Dendrobium aclinia
- Dendrobium acuminatissimum
- Dendrobium acutilingue
- Dendrobium agusanense
- Dendrobium albayense
- Dendrobium aliciae
- Dendrobium aloifolium
- Dendrobium amethystoglossum endemic to the Philippines
- Dendrobium anosmum
- Dendrobium aphyllum
- Dendrobium appendiculatum
- Dendrobium auriculatum endemic to the Philippines
- Dendrobium balzerianum endemic to the Philippines
- Dendrobium bancanum
- Dendrobium basilanense
- Dendrobium bicaudatum
- Dendrobium bicolense
- Dendrobium blanche-amesiae
- Dendrobium blumei
- Dendrobium boosii
- Dendrobium bukidnonense
- Dendrobium bullenianum
- Dendrobium bunuanense
- Dendrobium busuangense endemic to the Philippines
- Dendrobium cabadbarense
- Dendrobium candoonense
- Dendrobium carinatum endemic to the Philippines
- Dendrobium ceraula endemic to the Philippines
- Dendrobium chameleon
- Dendrobium chloranthum
- Dendrobium chrysographatum
- Dendrobium clemensiae
- Dendrobium comatum
- Dendrobium compactum
- Dendrobium compressum
- Dendrobium conanthum
- Dendrobium convexum
- Dendrobium crassimarginatum
- Dendrobium crumenatum
- Dendrobium davaoense
- Dendrobium dearei
- Dendrobium decoratum
- Dendrobium derekcabactulanii
- Dendrobium diffusum
- Dendrobium distichum endemic to the Philippines
- Dendrobium equitans
- Dendrobium erosum
- Dendrobium escritorii
- Dendrobium eurorum
- Dendrobium fairchildiae endemic to the Philippines
- Dendrobium gerlandianum endemic to the Philippines
- Dendrobium goldschmidtianum
- Dendrobium guerreroi endemic to the Philippines
- Dendrobium hercoglossum
- Dendrobium heterocarpum
- Dendrobium hymenanthum
- Dendrobium indivisum
- Dendrobium interjectum
- Dendrobium ionopus
- Dendrobium josephinae
- Dendrobium junceum endemic to the Philippines
- Dendrobium junctilobum
- Dendrobium leytense
- Dendrobium lobbii
- Dendrobium loherianum
- Dendrobium lunatum
- Dendrobium luxurians
- Dendrobium luzonense
- Dendrobium macrophyllum
- Dendrobium marivelense
- Dendrobium merrillii endemic to the Philippines
- Dendrobium metachilinum
- Dendrobium microphyton
- Dendrobium milaniae endemic to the Philippines
- Dendrobium mindanaense endemic to the Philippines
- Dendrobium miyasakii
- Dendrobium modestum
- Dendrobium multiramosum
- Dendrobium nebularum
- Dendrobium nemorale endemic to the Philippines
- Dendrobium niveobarbatum endemic to the Philippines
- Dendrobium obrienianum
- Dendrobium omissum
- Dendrobium orbilobulatum endemic to the Philippines
- Dendrobium ornithoflorum
- Dendrobium pachyphyllum
- Dendrobium papilio endemic to the Philippines
- Dendrobium parciflorum
- Dendrobium parietiforme
- Dendrobium parthenium
- Dendrobium pentapterum
- Dendrobium pergracile
- Dendrobium philippinense endemic to the Philippines

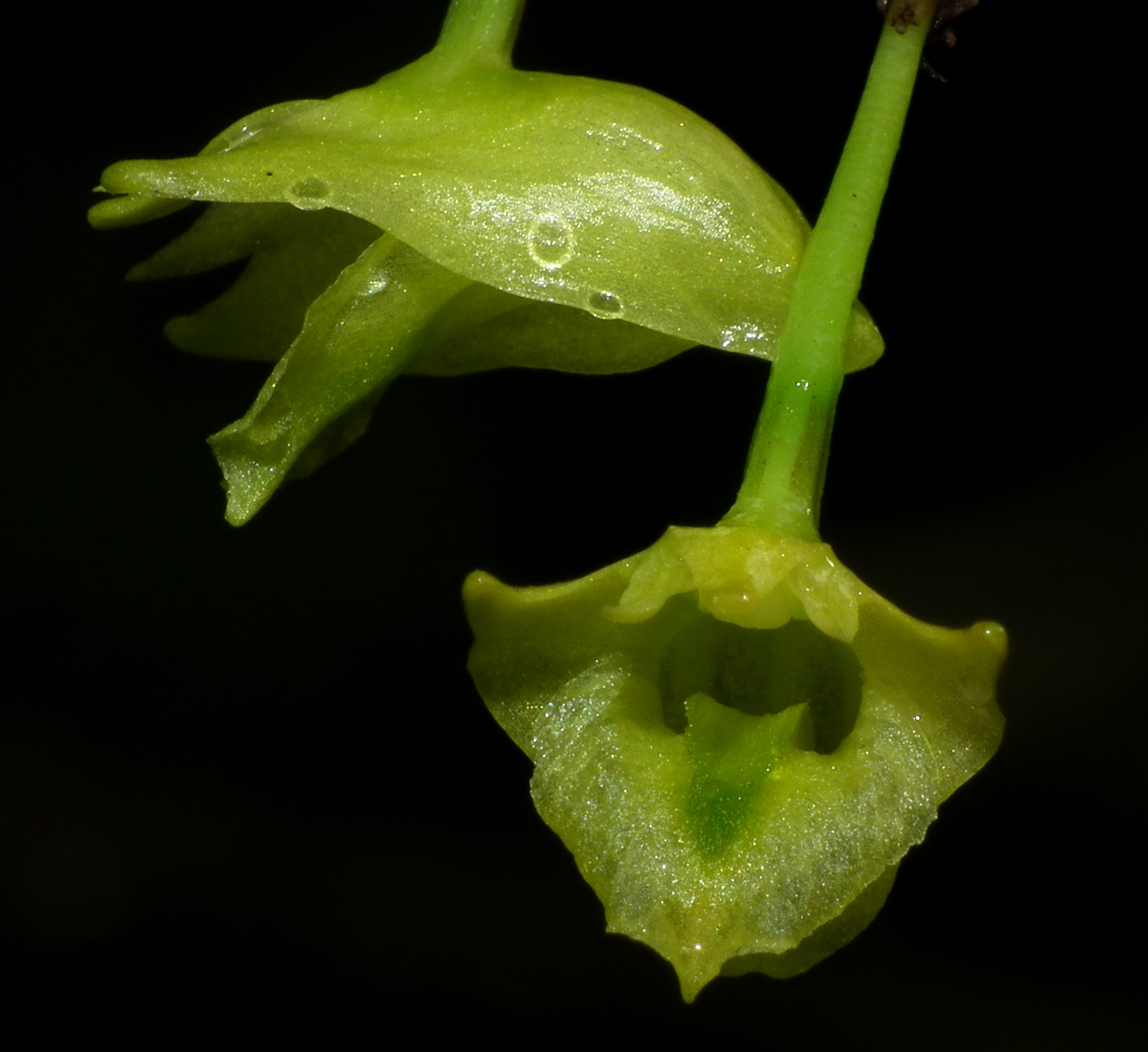
Dendrobium philippinense

- Dendrobium phillipsii endemic to the Philippines
- Dendrobium planibulbe
- Dendrobium planum
- Dendrobium plicatile
- Dendrobium polytrichum endemic to the Philippines
- Dendrobium profusum endemic to the Philippines
- Dendrobium pseudoconvexum
- Dendrobium pseudoequitans
- Dendrobium pterocarpum
- Dendrobium purpureostelidium
- Dendrobium quisumbingii
- Dendrobium ramosii endemic to the Philippines
- Dendrobium ravanii
- Dendrobium reypimentelii
- Dendrobium rhodochilum
- Dendrobium rhombeum endemic to the Philippines
- Dendrobium sanderae endemic to the Philippines
- Dendrobium sanguinolentum
- Dendrobium schettleri
- Dendrobium schuetzei endemic to the Philippines
- Dendrobium scopa
- Dendrobium secundum
- Dendrobium serratilabium endemic to the Philippines
- Dendrobium sibuyanense
- Dendrobium sinuosum
- Dendrobium spurium
- Dendrobium stella-silvae
- Dendrobium stricticalcarum
- Dendrobium stuposum
- Dendrobium taurinum endemic to the Philippines
- Dendrobium tetrachromum
- Dendrobium thysanophorum
- Dendrobium tiongii
- Dendrobium treacherianum
- Dendrobium unicorne
- Dendrobium uniflorum
- Dendrobium × usitae endemic to the Philippines
- Dendrobium usterii
- Dendrobium usterioides
- Dendrobium velutinelabrum
- Dendrobium ventricosum
- Dendrobium victoriae-reginae endemic to the Philippines
- Dendrobium wenzelii endemic to the Philippines
- Dendrobium yeageri endemic to the Philippines
- Dendrobium zamboangense

== Dendrochilum ==
- Dendrochilum abortum
- Dendrochilum affine
- Dendrochilum amesianum
- Dendrochilum anfractum
  - var. anfractoides
- Dendrochilum apiculatum
- Dendrochilum apoense
- Dendrochilum arachnites
- Dendrochilum asperum
- Dendrochilum auriculare
- Dendrochilum banksii
- Dendrochilum binuangense
- Dendrochilum cinnabarinum
  - var. sanguineum
- Dendrochilum cobbianum
- Dendrochilum coccineum
- Dendrochilum convallariiforme
  - var. minor
- Dendrochilum cootesii
- Dendrochilum copelandii
- Dendrochilum cordatum
- Dendrochilum croceum
- Dendrochilum curranii
  - var. serratoi
- Dendrochilum cymbiforme
- Dendrochilum ecallosum
- Dendrochilum edanoi
- Dendrochilum elmeri
- Dendrochilum exiguum
- Dendrochilum exile
- Dendrochilum eximium
- Dendrochilum filiforme
- Dendrochilum flexuosum
- Dendrochilum foxworthyi
- Dendrochilum geigeri
- Dendrochilum glumaceum
- Dendrochilum graciliscapum
- Dendrochilum graminifolium
- Dendrochilum hampelii
- Dendrochilum hastatum
- Dendrochilum hutchinsonianum
- Dendrochilum irigense
- Dendrochilum javierense
- Dendrochilum kingii
- Dendrochilum kopfii
- Dendrochilum latifolium
  - var. macranthum
- Dendrochilum loheri
- Dendrochilum longibulbum
- Dendrochilum longifolium
- Dendrochilum longilabre
- Dendrochilum louisianum
- Dendrochilum luzonense
- Dendrochilum macgregorii
- Dendrochilum magnum
- Dendrochilum maleolens
- Dendrochilum malindangense
- Dendrochilum marginatum
- Dendrochilum mearnsii
- Dendrochilum merrillii
- Dendrochilum microchilum
- Dendrochilum migueldavidii
- Dendrochilum mindanaense
- Dendrochilum mindorense
- Dendrochilum niveum
- Dendrochilum ocellatum
- Dendrochilum oliganthum
- Dendrochilum oreophilum
- Dendrochilum pallidiflavens
- Dendrochilum pangasinanense
- Dendrochilum parvipapillatum
- Dendrochilum parvulum
  - var. strictiforme
- Dendrochilum perplexum
  - var. montanum
- Dendrochilum philippinense
  - var. purpureum
- Dendrochilum plocoglottoides
- Dendrochilum prodigiosum
- Dendrochilum propinquum
- Dendrochilum pseudowenzelii
- Dendrochilum pulcherrimum
- Dendrochilum pulogense
- Dendrochilum pumilum
  - var. recurvum
- Dendrochilum quadrilobum
- Dendrochilum quinquecallosum
- Dendrochilum quisumbingianum
- Dendrochilum ravanii
- Dendrochilum reniforme
- Dendrochilum rhombophorum
- Dendrochilum rotundilabium
- Dendrochilum saccolabium
- Dendrochilum schweinfurthianum
- Dendrochilum septemnervium
- Dendrochilum simulacrum
- Dendrochilum smithianum
- Dendrochilum stenophyllum
- Dendrochilum tenellum
- Dendrochilum tenuibulbum
- Dendrochilum tenuifolium
- Dendrochilum tetradactyliferum
- Dendrochilum tiongianum
- Dendrochilum tortile
- Dendrochilum turpe
- Dendrochilum uncatum
  - var. longispicatum
- Dendrochilum undulatum
- Dendrochilum unicallosum
- Dendrochilum unicorne
- Dendrochilum vanoverberghii
- Dendrochilum warrenii
- Dendrochilum wenzelii
- Dendrochilum williamsii
- Dendrochilum woodianum
- Dendrochilum yuccifolium

== Dendrolirium ==
- Dendrolirium ornatum

== Didymoplexis ==
- Didymoplexis micradenia
- Didymoplexis pallens
- Didymoplexis philippinensis

== Dienia ==
- Dienia carinata
- Dienia ophrydis

== Diglyphosa ==
- Diglyphosa elmeri
- Diglyphosa latifolia

== Dilochia ==
- Dilochia elmeri
- Dilochia wallichii

== Dipodium ==
- Dipodium fevrellii
- Dipodium paludosum
- Dipodium pictum
- Dipodium scandens

== Disperis ==
- Disperis neilgherrensis

== Epiblastus ==
- Epiblastus merrillii

== Epipogium ==
- Epipogium roseum

== Eria ==
- Eria albolutea
- Eria aliciae
- Eria aporoides
- Eria binabayensis
- Eria brachystachya
- Eria cootesii
- Eria cymbiformis
- Eria elisheae
- Eria fastigiatifolia
- Eria halconensis
- Eria javanica
- Eria longissima
- Eria mearnsii
- Eria odorifera
- Eria ornata
- Eria perspicabilis
- Eria propinqua
- Eria ramosii
- Eria robusta
- Eria sessilifolia

== Erythrodes ==
- Erythrodes boettcheri
- Erythrodes weberi
- Erythrodes wenzelii
- Erythrorchis altissima

== Euanthe ==
- Vanda sanderiana endemic to the Philippines

== Eulophia ==
- Eulophia bicallosa
- Eulophia dentata
- Eulophia exaltata
- Eulophia graminea
- Eulophia pulchra
- Eulophia spectabilis
- Eulophia stricta
- Eulophia zollingeri

== Galeola ==
- Galeola nudifolia

== Gastrochilus ==
- Gastrochilus calceolaris
- Gastrochilus sororius

== Gastrodia ==
- Gastrodia javanica
- Gastrodia verrucosa

== Geodorum ==
- Geodorum densiflorum
- Geodorum terrestre

== Glomera ==
- Glomera gastrodioides
- Glomera merrillii

== Goodyera ==
- Goodyera clausa
- Goodyera elmeri
- Goodyera fumata
- Goodyera luzonensis
- Goodyera procera
- Goodyera ramosii
- Goodyera rubicunda
- Goodyera viridiflora

== Grammatophyllum ==
- Grammatophyllum elegans
- Grammatophyllum martae endemic to the Philippines
- Grammatophyllum measuresianum endemic to the Philippines
- Grammatophyllum multiflorum endemic to the Philippines
  - fma. tigrinum
- Grammatophyllum ravanii
- Grammatophyllum rumphianum
- Grammatophyllum scriptum
- Grammatophyllum speciosum
- Grammatophyllum stapeliiflorum
- Grammatophyllum wallisii

== Grosourdya ==
- Grosourdya appendiculata
- Grosourdya muscosa
- Grosourdya tripercus

== Habenaria ==
- Habenaria alagensis
- Habenaria aristulifera
- Habenaria boadanensis
- Habenaria congesta
- Habenaria curranii
- Habenaria dentata
- Habenaria diphylla
- Habenaria falcigera
- Habenaria leibergii
- Habenaria lingulosa
- Habenaria malintana
- Habenaria mearnsii
- Habenaria muricata
- Habenaria polytricha
- Habenaria ponerostachys
- Habenaria reticulata
- Habenaria rhodocheila
  - subsp. philippinensis
- Habenaria robinsonii
- Habenaria rosulata
- Habenaria rumphii
- Habenaria stenopetala
- Habenaria vanoverberghii
- Habenaria warburgana
- Habenaria zephyrica

== Herminium ==
- Herminium lanceum

== Hetaeria ==
- Hetaeria anomala
- Hetaeria elata
- Hetaeria oblongifolia

== Hippeophyllum ==
- Hippeophyllum wenzelii

== Hylophila ==
- Hylophila lanceolata
- Hylophila rubra

== Hymenorchis ==
- Hymenorchis vanoverberghii

== Kuhlhasseltia ==
- Kuhlhasseltia whiteheadii
- Kuhlhasseltia yakushimensis

== Lecanorchis ==
- Lecanorchis javanica

== Lepidogyne ==
- Lepidogyne longifolia

== Liparis ==
- Liparis acaulis
- Liparis amesiana
- Liparis asinacephala
- Liparis barbata
- Liparis benguetensis
- Liparis bicuspidata
- Liparis bontocensis
- Liparis bootanensis
- Liparis carnicolor
- Liparis cauliflora
- Liparis cespitosa
- Liparis condylobulbon
- Liparis cumingii
- Liparis distans
- Liparis dumaguetensis
- Liparis elegans
- Liparis elliptica
- Liparis elmeri
- Liparis fragilis
- Liparis grossa
- Liparis halconensis
- Liparis latifolia
- Liparis leytensis
- Liparis linearifolia
- Liparis magnicallosa
- Liparis merrillii
- Liparis negrosiana
- Liparis nervosa
- Liparis nutans
- Liparis palawanensis
- Liparis pallida
- Liparis parviflora
- Liparis philippinensis
- Liparis prava
- Liparis propinqua
- Liparis somae
- Liparis tricallosa
- Liparis trichoglottis
- Liparis viridicallus
- Liparis viridiflora

== Ludisia ==
- Ludisia discolor
- Ludisia ravanii

== Luisia ==
- Luisia cordatilabia
- Luisia curtisii
- Luisia foxworthii
- Luisia ramosii
- Luisia tristis

== Macodes ==
- Macodes petola

== Macropodanthus ==
- Macropodanthus cootesii endemic to the Philippines
- Macropodanthus philippinense endemic to the Philippines

== Malaxis ==
- Malaxis bulusanensis
- Malaxis longipedunculata
- Malaxis monophyllos

== Megalotus ==
- Megalotus bifidus

== Micropera ==
- Micropera edanoi
- Micropera loheri
- Micropera philippinensis
- Micropera utriculosa

== Microsaccus ==
- Microsaccus griffithii
- Microsaccus wenzelii

== Microtatorchis ==
- Microtatorchis aristata
- Microtatorchis compacta

== Microtis ==
- Microtis unifolia

== Mycaranthes ==
- Mycaranthes anceps
- Mycaranthes candoonensis
- Mycaranthes citrina
- Mycaranthes clemensiae
- Mycaranthes davaensis
- Mycaranthes gigantea
- Mycaranthes lamellata
- Mycaranthes leonardoi
- Mycaranthes longibracteata
- Mycaranthes major
- Mycaranthes mindanaensis
- Mycaranthes oblitterata
- Mycaranthes vanoverberghii

== Myrmechis ==
- Myrmechis gracilis
- Myrmechis perpusilla
- Myrmechis philippinensiis

== Nephelaphyllum ==
- Nephelaphyllum mindorense
- Nephelaphyllum pulchrum

== Nervilia ==
- Nervilia concolor
- Nervilia crociformis
- Nervilia dilatata
- Nervilia plicata

== Neuwiedia ==
- Neuwiedia veratrifolia

== Oberonia ==
- Oberonia aporophylla
- Oberonia basilanensis
- Oberonia benguetensis
- Oberonia cylindrica
- Oberonia elmeri
- Oberonia hispidula
- Oberonia leytensis
- Oberonia lipensis
- Oberonia luzonensis
- Oberonia lycopodioides
- Oberonia mcgregorii
- Oberonia merrillii
- Oberonia mindorensis
- Oberonia minima
- Oberonia minutissima
- Oberonia monstruosa
- Oberonia mucronata
- Oberonia obesa
- Oberonia reilloi
- Oberonia rufilabris
- Oberonia setigera endemic to the Philippines
- Oberonia surigaensis
- Oberonia thisbe
- Oberonia toppingii
- Oberonia wenzelii

== Octarrhena ==
- Octarrhena amesiana
- Octarrhena elmeri
- Octarrhena ensifolia
- Octarrhena gemmifera
- Octarrhena parvula

== Omoea ==
- Omoea philippinensis endemic to the Philippines

== Orchipedum ==
- Orchipedum wenzelii

== Oxystophyllum ==
- Oxystophyllum carnosum
- Oxystophyllum cultratum
- Oxystophyllum elmeri

== Pachystoma ==
- Pachystoma pubescens

== Paphiopedilum ==
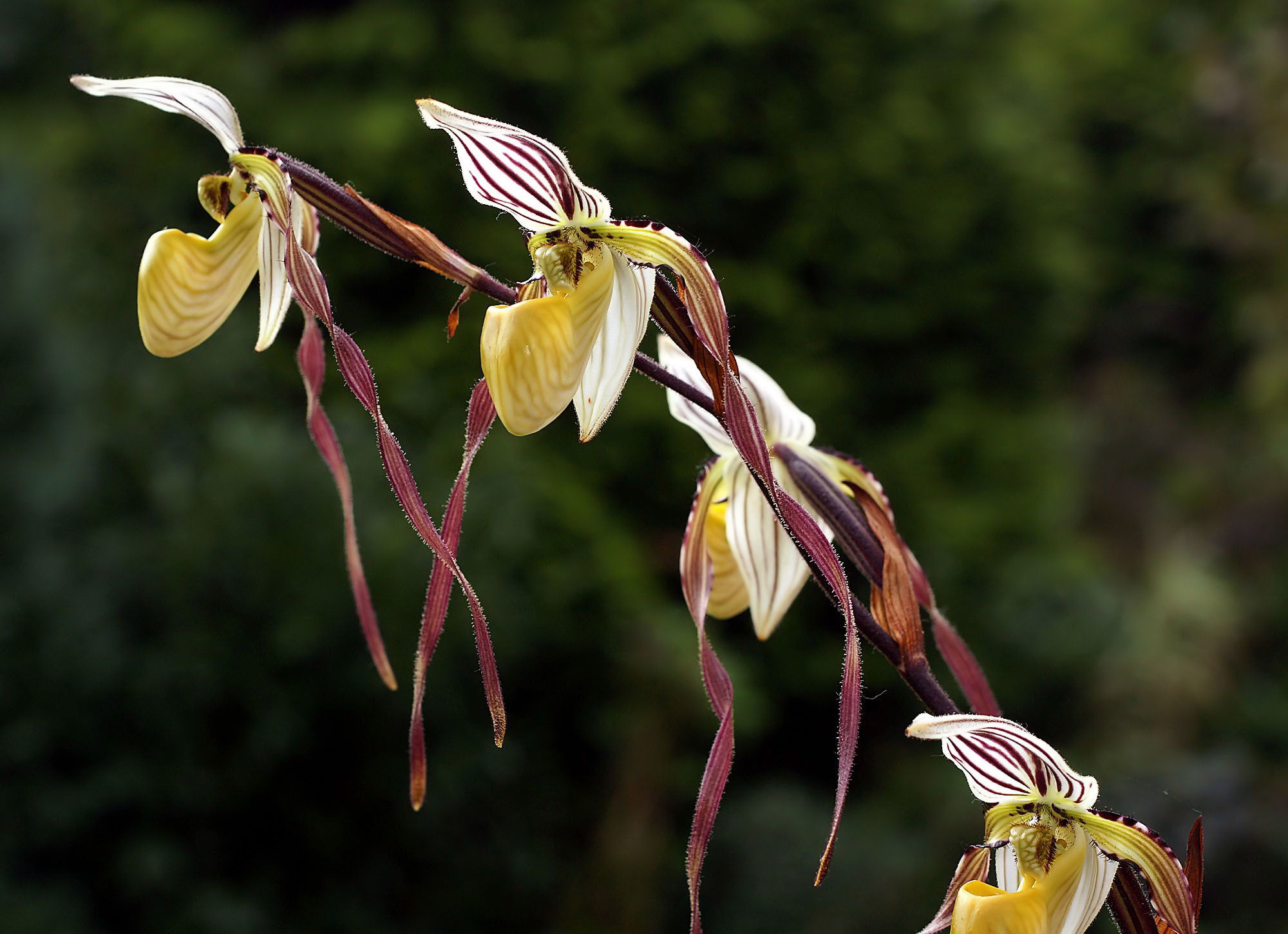
Paphiopedilum philippinense

- Paphiopedilum acmodontum
- Paphiopedilum adductum
- Paphiopedilum argus endemic to the Philippines
- Paphiopedilum barbatum
- Paphiopedilum ciliolare
- Paphiopedilum x expansum
- Paphiopedilum fowliei endemic to the Philippines
- Paphiopedilum haynaldianum endemic to the Philippines
- Paphiopedilum hennisianum endemic to the Philippines
- Paphiopedilum parnatanum endemic to the Philippines
- Paphiopedilum philippinense endemic to the Philippines
  - var. roebelenii
- Paphiopedilum randsii endemic to the Philippines
- Paphiopedilum superbiens
- Paphiopedilum urbanianum endemic to the Philippines

== Parapteroceras ==
- Parapteroceras escritorii
- Parapteroceras quisumbingii

== Pennilabium ==
- Pennilabium confusum
- Pennilabium luzonense

== Peristylus ==
- Peristylus constrictus
- Peristylus copelandii
- Peristylus goodyeroides
- Peristylus gracilis
- Peristylus grandis
- Peristylus intrudens
- Peristylus lacertifer
- Peristylus monticola

== Phaius ==
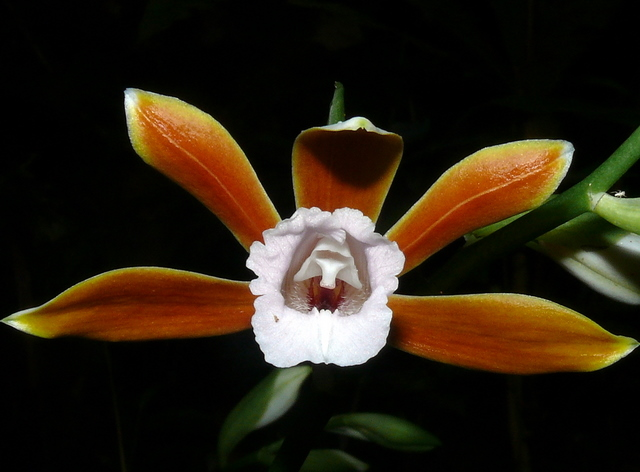
Phaius philippinensis

- Phaius amboinensis
- Phaius antoninae
- Phaius borneensis
- Phaius callosus
- Phaius flavus
- Phaius fragilis
- Phaius lyonii
- Phaius mishmensis
- Phaius philippinensis
- Phaius tankervilleae

== Phalaenopsis ==
Found in Himalayan mountains, Southern India and rest of Southeast Asia, the most number of species for this genus of orchids are found in the Philippines. The country represents the center of Phalaenopsis orchids with about twenty two species and several natural hybrids, more than any other country in the world. Some of the species endemic to the Philippines such as P. stuartiana, P. sanderiana and P. schilleriana, have had the greatest influence on hybridizing than any other Phalaenopsis species.

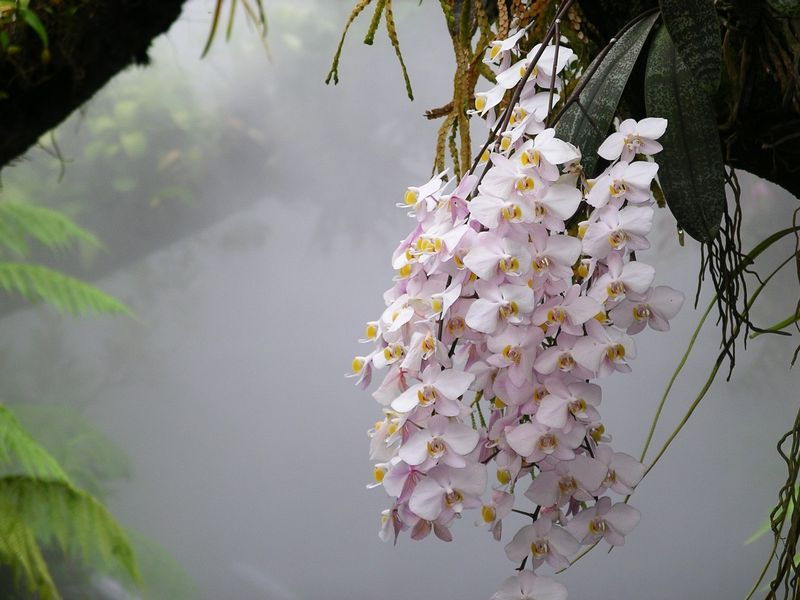
Phalaenopsis philippinensis habitus in Singapore's National Orchid Garden

- Phalaenopsis amabilis
- Phalaenopsis × amphitrite
- Phalaenopsis aphrodite
- Phalaenopsis bastianii endemic to the Philippines
- Phalaenopsis cornu-cervi
- Phalaenopsis deliciosa
- Phalaenopsis equestris
- Phalaenopsis fasciata endemic to the Philippines
- Phalaenopsis fuscata
- Phalaenopsis hieroglyphica endemic to the Philippines
- Phalaenopsis × intermedia endemic to the Philippines
- Phalaenopsis × leucorrhoda
- Phalaenopsis lindenii endemic to the Philippines
- Phalaenopsis lueddemanniana endemic to the Philippines
- Phalaenopsis mariae
- Phalaenopsis micholitzii endemic to the Philippines
- Phalaenopsis pallens endemic to the Philippines
- Phalaenopsis philippinensis endemic to the Philippines
- Phalaenopsis pulchra endemic to the Philippines
- Phalaenopsis reichenbachiana endemic to the Philippines
- Phalaenopsis sanderiana endemic to the Philippines
- Phalaenopsis schilleriana endemic to the Philippines
- Phalaenopsis stuartiana endemic to the Philippines
- Phalaenopsis sumatrana
- Phalaenopsis × veitchiana
- Phalaenopsis venosa

== Pholidota ==
- Pholidota articulata
- Pholidota carnea
- Pholidota imbricata
- Pholidota ventricosa

== Phragmorchis ==
- Phragmorchis teretifolia

== Phreatia ==
- Phreatia amesii
- Phreatia aristulifera
- Phreatia caulescens
- Phreatia densiflora
- Phreatia infundibuliformis
- Phreatia listrophora
- Phreatia luzoniensis
- Phreatia mearnsii
- Phreatia negrosiana
- Phreatia plantaginifolia
- Phreatia ramosii
- Phreatia sulcata
- Phreatia tahitensis
- Phreatia vanoverberghii
- Phreatia wenzelii
- Phreatia xantholeuca

== Pilophyllum ==
- Pilophyllum villosum

== Pinalia ==
- Pinalia barbifrons
- Pinalia bractescens
- Pinalia carnicolor
- Pinalia compacta
- Pinalia copelandii
- Pinalia copelandii
- Pinalia curranii
- Pinalia cylindrostachya
- Pinalia dagamensis
- Pinalia densa
- Pinalia floribunda
- Pinalia graciliscapa
- Pinalia hutchinsoniana
- Pinalia jarensis
- Pinalia leavittii
- Pinalia longicruris
- Pinalia longilabris
- Pinalia lyonii
- Pinalia macera
- Pinalia maquilingensis
- Pinalia merrittii
- Pinalia microchila
- Pinalia nielsenii
- Pinalia ovata
- Pinalia philippinensis
- Pinalia polyura endemic to the Philippines
- Pinalia profusa
- Pinalia puguahaanensis
- Pinalia ramosa
- Pinalia rhodoptera
- Pinalia ringens
- Pinalia senilis
- Pinalia taylorii
- Pinalia tridens
- Pinalia ventricosa
- Pinalia woodiana
- Pinalia xanthocheila

== Platanthera ==
- Platanthera angustata
- Platanthera singgalangensis

== Plocoglottis ==
- Plocoglottis bicallosa
- Plocoglottis bicomata
- Plocoglottis copelandii
- Plocoglottis javanica
- Plocoglottis loheriana
- Plocoglottis lucbanensis
- Plocoglottis mindorensis
- Plocoglottis plicata

== Poaephyllum ==
- Poaephyllum grandiflorum
- Poaephyllum pauciflorum

== Podochilus ==
- Podochilus bicaudatus
- Podochilus cumingii
- Podochilus hystricinus
- Podochilus intricatus
- Podochilus longilabris
- Podochilus lucescens
- Podochilus plumosus
- Podochilus ramosii
- Podochilus sciuroides
- Podochilus strictus

== Polystachya ==
- Polystachya concreta

== Pomatocalpa ==
- Pomatocalpa bicolor
- Pomatocalpa diffusum
- Pomatocalpa fuscum
- Pomatocalpa kunstleri
- Pomatocalpa maculosum
  - subsp. andamanicum
- Pomatocalpa spicatum

== Porphyrodesme ==
- Porphyrodesme papuana
- Porphyrodesme sarcanthoides

== Pseuderia ==
- Pseuderia samarana endemic to the Philippines

== Pseudovanilla ==
- Pseudovanilla philippinensis

== Pteroceras ==
- Pteroceras cladostachyum
- Pteroceras leopardinum
- Pteroceras longicalcareum
- Pteroceras pallidum
- Pteroceras philippinense
- Pteroceras teres
- Pteroceras unguiculatum

== Renanthera ==
- Renanthera breviflora
- Renanthera elongata
- Renanthera matutina
- Renanthera monachica endemic to the Philippines
- Renanthera philippinensis endemic to the Philippines
- Renanthera storiei endemic to the Philippines

== Rhomboda ==
- Rhomboda blackii
- Rhomboda cristata
- Rhomboda lanceolata

== Rhynchostylis ==
- Rhynchostylis gigantea
  - subsp. violacea
- Rhynchostylis retusa
- Rhynchostylis rieferi

== Robiquetia ==
- Robiquetia ascendens
- Robiquetia aberrans
- Robiquetia baliensis
- Robiquetia cerina
- Robiquetia compressa
- Robiquetia constricta
- Robiquetia discolor
- Robiquetia enigma
- Robiquetia pantherina
- Robiquetia spathulata
- Robiquetia vanoverberghii
- Robiquetia eburnea
- Robiquetia flammea
- Robiquetia lyonii
- Robiquetiaa schizogenia

== Saccolabiopsis ==
- Saccolabiopsis tenella
- Saccolabiopsis viridiflora

== Samarorchis ==
- Samarorchis sulitiana

== Santotomasia ==
- Santotomasia wardiana

== Sarcophyton ==
- Sarcophyton crassifolium
- Sarcophyton pachyphyllum

== Schoenorchis ==
- Schoenorchis micrantha
- Schoenorchis paniculata
- Schoenorchis vanoverberghii

== Schuitemania ==
- Schuitemania merrillii

== Spathoglottis ==
- Spathoglottis chrysantha
- Spathoglottis elmeri
- Spathoglottis kimballiana
- Spathoglottis palawanensis
- Spathoglottis x parsonsii
- Spathoglottis philippinensis
- Spathoglottis plicata
- Spathoglottis tomentosa
- Spathoglottis vanoverberghii

== Spiranthes ==
- Spiranthes sinensis

== Staurochilus ==
Moved to trichoglottis

== Stereochilus ==
- Stereochilus ringens

== Stereosandra ==
- Stereosandra javanica

== Stichorkis ==
- Stichorkis compressa
- Stichorkis disticha
- Stichorkis gibbosa

== Taeniophyllum ==
- Taeniophyllum biocellatum
- Taeniophyllum copelandii
- Taeniophyllum elmeri
- Taeniophyllum leytense
- Taeniophyllum merrillii
- Taeniophyllum philippinense
- Taeniophyllum saccatum

== Tainia ==
- Tainia elmeri endemic to the Philippines
- Tainia maingayi

== Thecostele ==
- Thecostele alata

== Thelasis ==
- Thelasis capitata
- Thelasis carinata
- Thelasis micrantha
- Thelasis obtusa
- Thelasis pygmaea

== Thelymitra ==
- Thelymitra javanica

== Thrixspermum ==
- Thrixspermum acuminatissimum
- Thrixspermum agusanense
- Thrixspermum amesianum
- Thrixspermum amplexicaule
- Thrixspermum angustatum
- Thrixspermum bromeliforme
- Thrixspermum celebicum
- Thrixspermum centipeda
- Thrixspermum cootesii
- Thrixspermum elmeri
- Thrixspermum elongatum
- Thrixspermum eximium
- Thrixspermum fantasticum
- Thrixspermum fernandeziae
- Thrixspermum hystrix
- Thrixspermum integrum
- Thrixspermum ligulatum
- Thrixspermum linearifolium
- Thrixspermum merguense
- Thrixspermum pensile
- Thrixspermum quinquelobum
- Thrixspermum robinsonii
- Thrixspermum rostratum
- Thrixspermum subulatum
- Thrixspermum vanoverberghii
- Thrixspermum weberi
- Thrixspermum wenzelii

== Trichoglottis ==
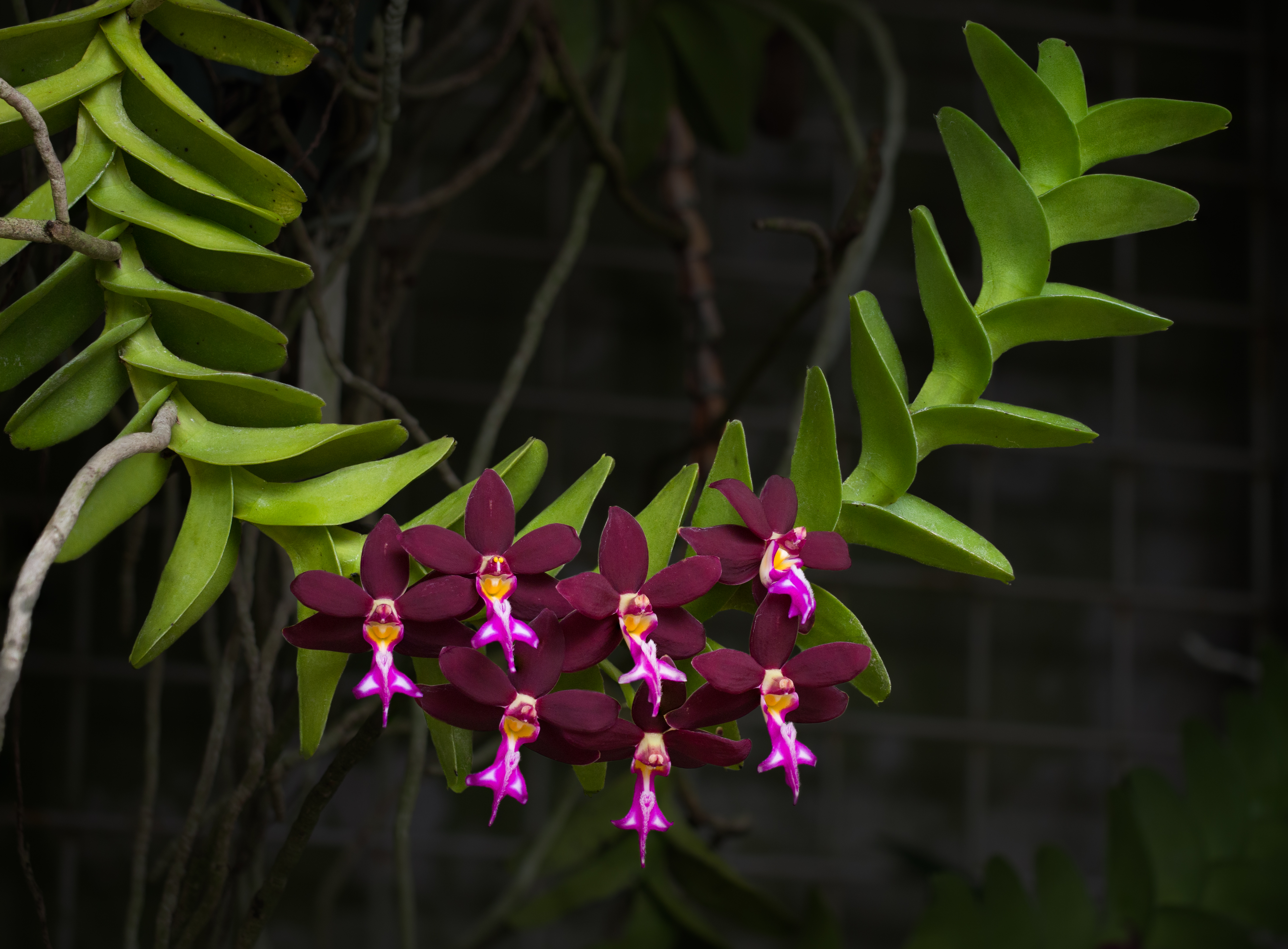
Trichoglottis atropurpurea in Brooklyn Botanic Garden

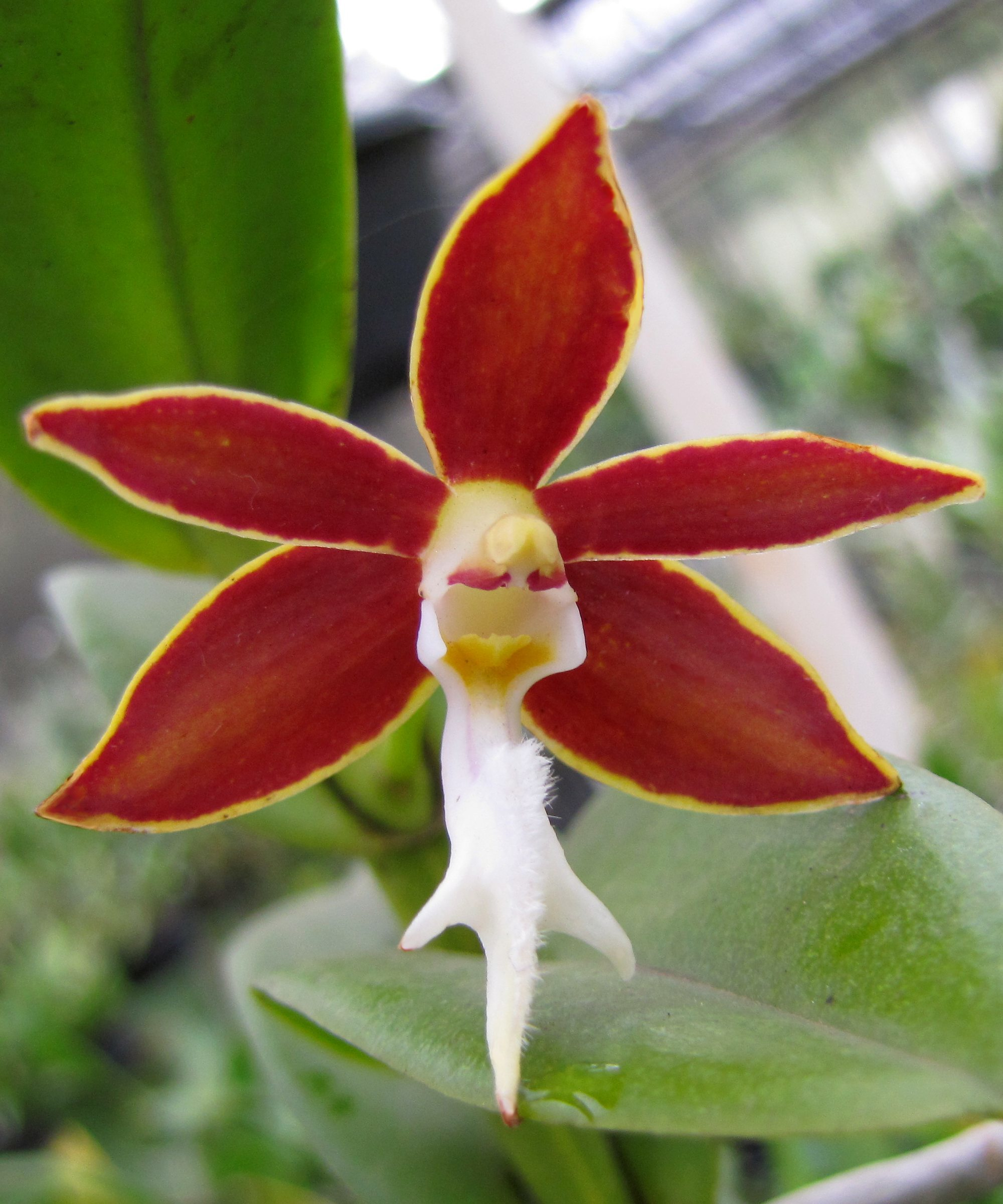
Trichoglottis philippinensis

- Trichoglottis amesiana
- Trichoglottis apoensis
- Trichoglottis atropurpurea endemic to the Philippines
- Trichoglottis brachystachya
- Trichoglottis calochila
- Trichoglottis geminata
- Trichoglottis latisepala
- Trichoglottis mindanaensis
- Trichoglottis philippinensis
- Trichoglottis rosea
- Trichoglottis solerederi
- Trichoglottis subviolacea
- Staurochilus agusanensis
- Staurochilus corazoniae
- Staurochilus fasciatus
- Staurochilus guibertii
- Staurochilus intermedius
- Staurochilus ionosmus
- Staurochilus leytensis
- Staurochilus loherianus
- Staurochilus luchuensis
- Staurochilus luzonensis
- Staurochilus mimicus
- Staurochilus tamesii

== Trichotosia ==
- Trichotosia fusca
- Trichotosia hirsutipetala
- Trichotosia lagunensis
- Trichotosia leytensis
- Trichotosia mcgregorii
- Trichotosia ramosii
- Trichotosia vulpina

== Tropidia ==
- Tropidia angulosa
- Tropidia mindanaensis
- Tropidia mindorensis
- Tropidia nipponica
- Tropidia pedunculata
- Tropidia robinsonii
- Tropidia schlechteriana
- Tropidia septemnervis
- Tropidia somae

== Tuberolabium ==
- Tuberolabium brevirhachis
- Tuberolabium guamense
- Tuberolabium kotoense
- Tuberolabium minutum
- Tuberolabium phillipsii
- Tuberolabium rhopalorrhachis
- Tuberolabium sarcochiloides
- Tuberolabium woodii

== Vanda ==
- Vanda aurantiacum
  - subsp. philippinense
- Vanda barnesii
- Vanda cootesii
- Vanda furva
- Vanda helvola
- Vanda javierae (Philippines - Luzon).
- Vanda lamellata
  - var. boxallii
- Vanda limbata
- Vanda luzonica (Philippines - Luzon).
- Vanda mariae
- Vanda merrillii (Philippines).
- Vanda miniatum
- Vanda mindanaoensis
- Vanda roeblingiana (Philippines - Luzon).
- Vanda sanderiana (Philippines - Mindanao)
- Vanda scandens
- Vanda tricolor
- Vanda ustii (Philippines - Luzon).

== Vandopsis ==
- Vandopsis lissochiloides

== Vanilla ==
- Vanilla calopogon
- Vanilla ovalis
- Vanilla platyphylla
- Vanilla raabii
- Vanilla deceasarii
- Vanilla philippinensis

== Vrydagzynea ==
- Vrydagzynea albida
- Vrydagzynea vrydagzynoides
- Vrydagzynea weberi

== Zeuxine ==
- Zeuxine elmeri
- Zeuxine flava
- Zeuxine lancifolia
- Zeuxine leytensis
- Zeuxine marivelensis
- Zeuxine mindanaensis
- Zeuxine nervosa
- Zeuxine parvifolia
- Zeuxine philippinensis
- Zeuxine strateumatica
- Zeuxine weberi
- Zeuxine wenzelii
