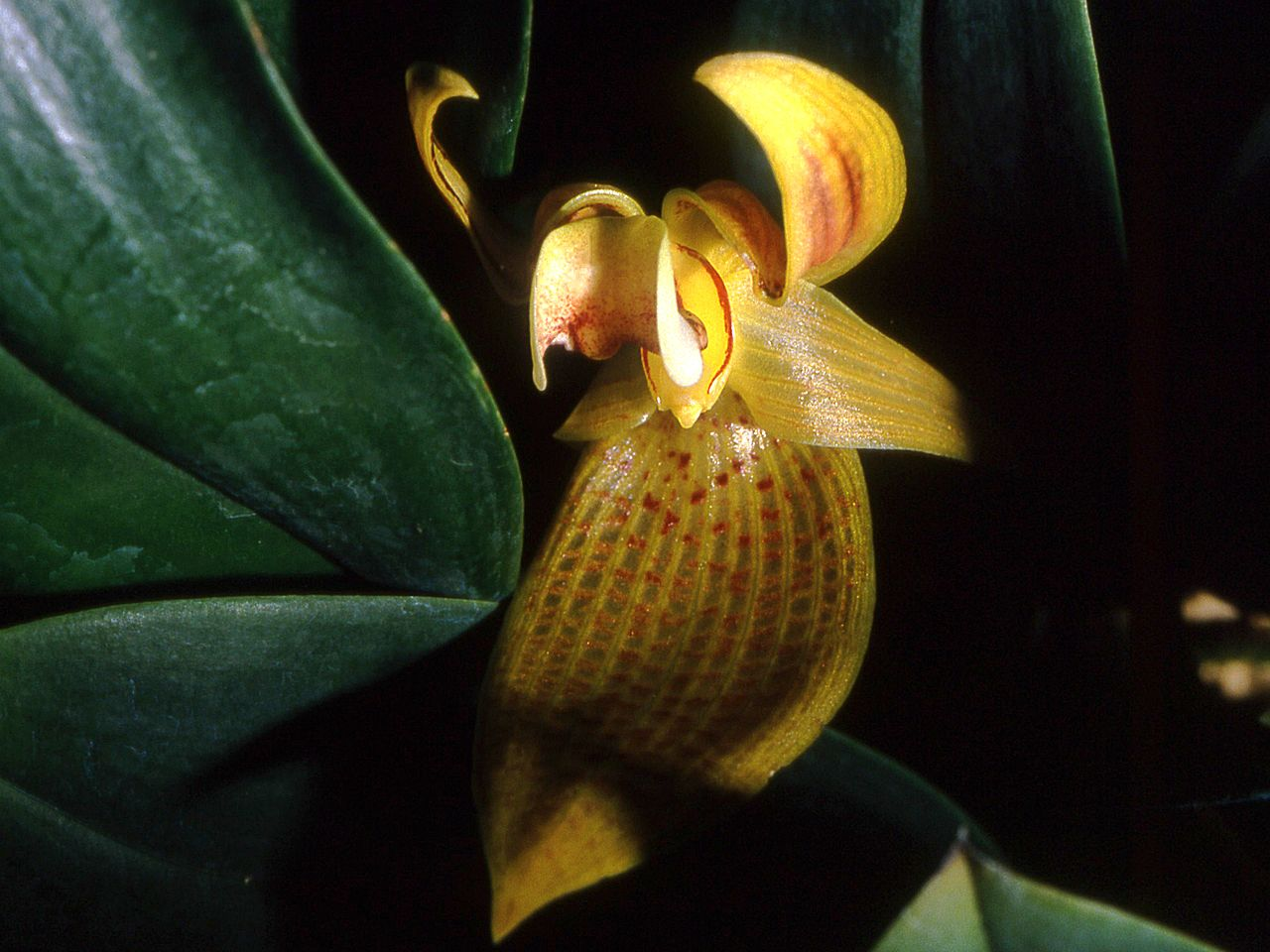

Scientific classification
- Kingdom: Plantae
- Clade: Tracheophytes
- Clade: Angiosperms
- Clade: Monocots
- Order: Asparagales
- Family: Orchidaceae
- Subfamily: Epidendroideae
- Genus: Bulbophyllum
- Species: B. dearei

Binomial name
- Bulbophyllum dearei (Rchb.f.) Rchb.f. (1888)

Synonyms
- Sarcopodium dearei Rchb.f. (1888) (Basionym); Bulbophyllum dearei H.J. Veitch(1888); Bulbophyllum godseffianum Weathers (1890); Phyllorkis dearei (Rchb.f.) Kuntze (1891); Bulbophyllum reticosum Ridl. (1896); Bulbophyllum punctatum Ridl. (1908)

= Bulbophyllum dearei =

Deare's bulbophyllum

Species of orchid

Bulbophyllum dearei (Deare's bulbophyllum) is a species of orchid.
