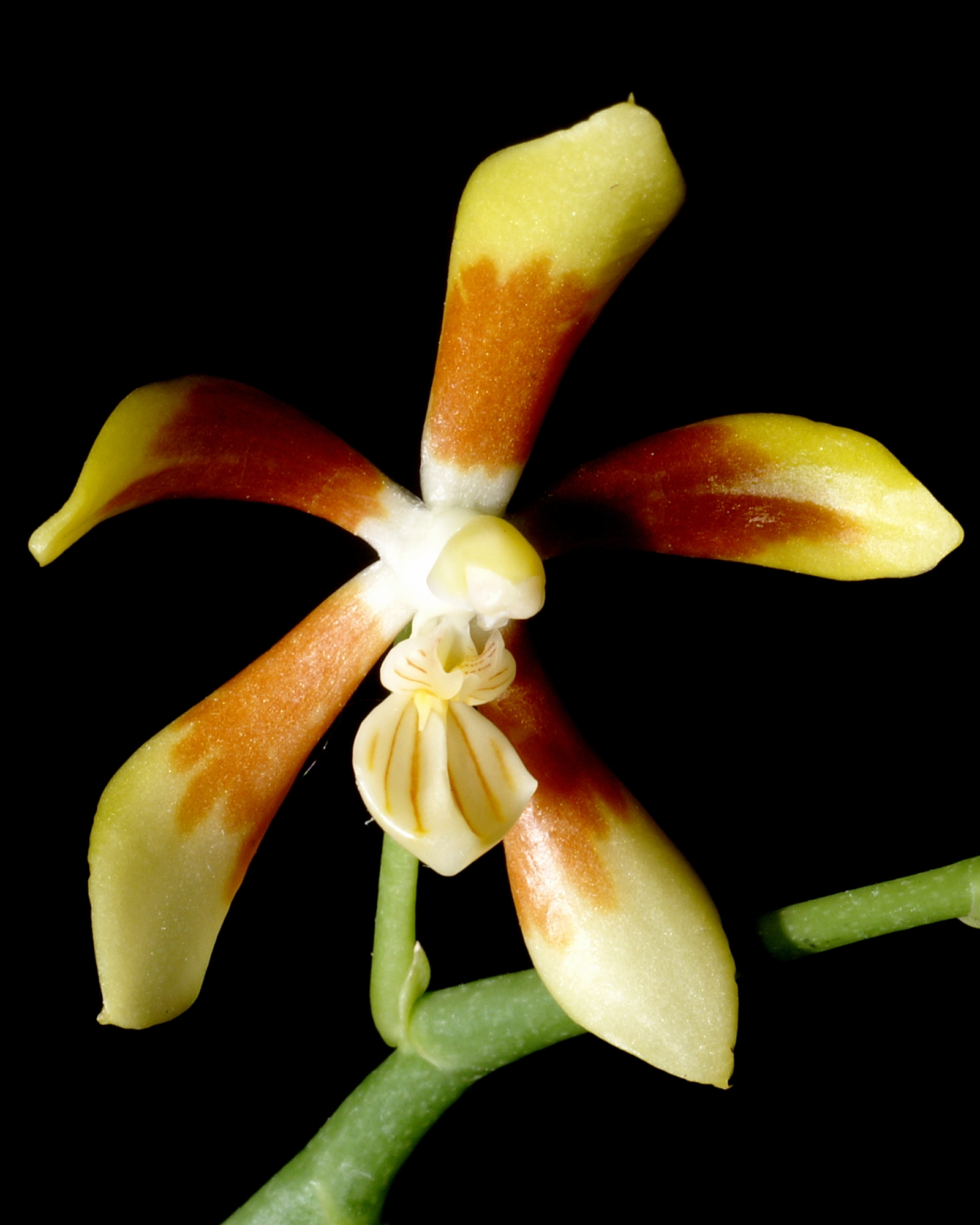
- Illustration of Phalaenopsis fuscata

Scientific classification
- Kingdom: Plantae
- Clade: Tracheophytes
- Clade: Angiosperms
- Clade: Monocots
- Order: Asparagales
- Family: Orchidaceae
- Subfamily: Epidendroideae
- Genus: Phalaenopsis
- Species: P. fuscata

Binomial name
- Phalaenopsis fuscata Rchb.f

Synonyms
- Phalaenopsis denisiana Cogn.; Polychilos fuscata (Rchb.f.) Shim

= Phalaenopsis fuscata =

Species of orchid

Phalaenopsis fuscata is a species of orchid endemic to western and central Malesia.
