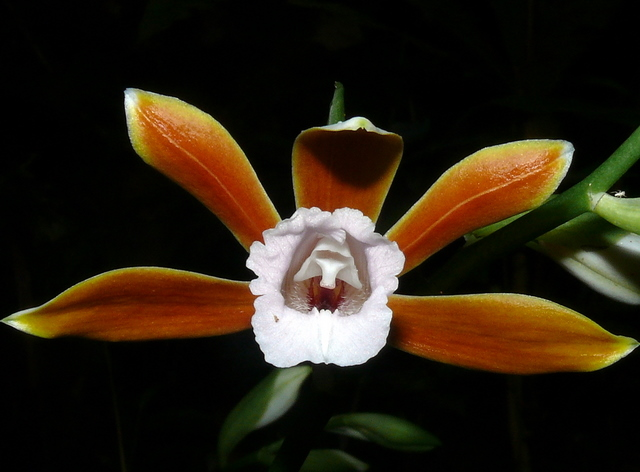

Scientific classification
- Kingdom: Plantae
- Clade: Tracheophytes
- Clade: Angiosperms
- Clade: Monocots
- Order: Asparagales
- Family: Orchidaceae
- Subfamily: Epidendroideae
- Genus: Phaius
- Species: P. philippinensis

Binomial name
- Phaius philippinensis N.E.Br.

= Phaius philippinensis =

Species of orchid

Phaius philippinensis is a species of orchid in the genus Phaius that was described by N. E. Brown in 1889. It is endemic to the Philippines.
