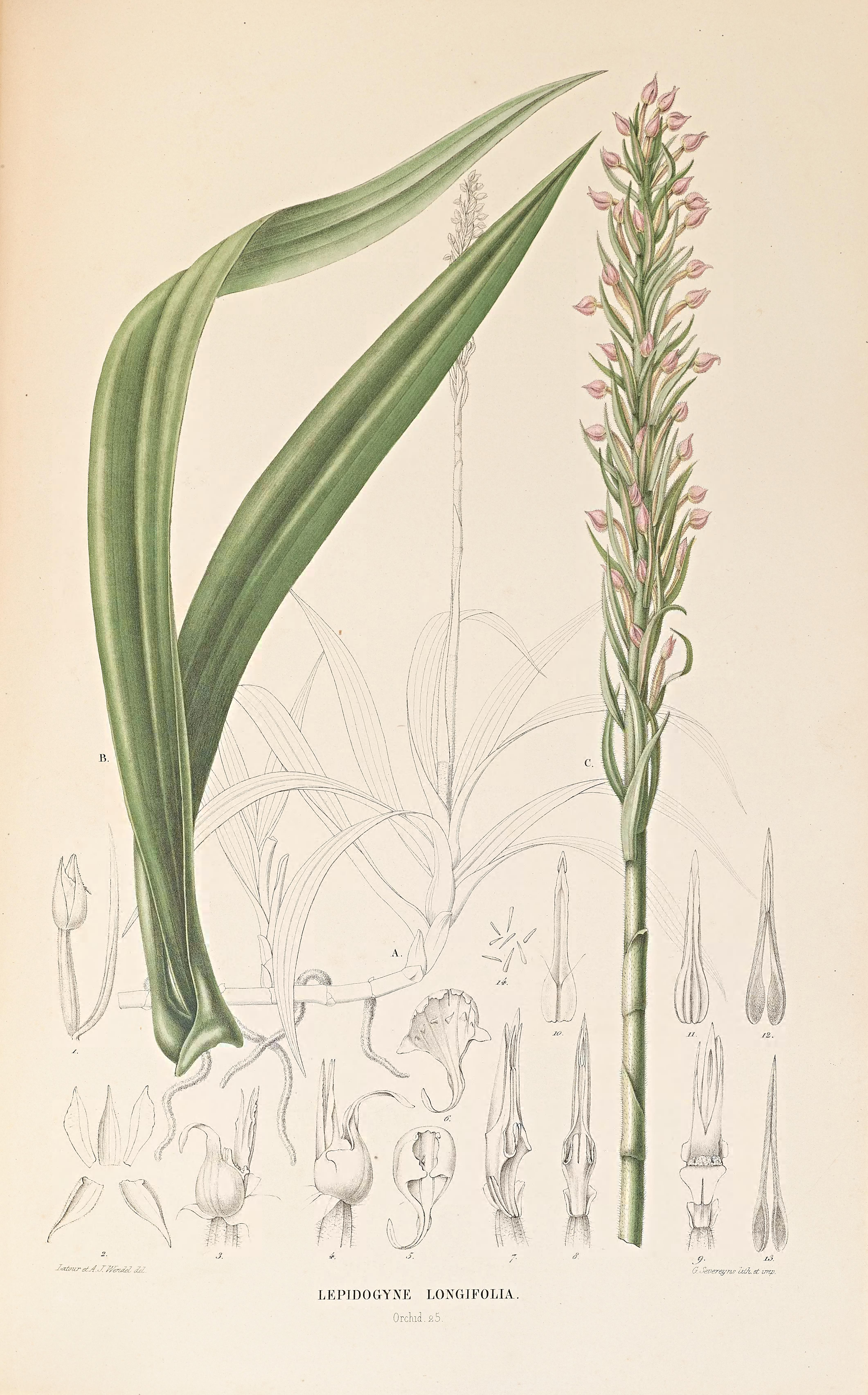
- 1858 illustration

Scientific classification
- Kingdom: Plantae
- Clade: Tracheophytes
- Clade: Angiosperms
- Clade: Monocots
- Order: Asparagales
- Family: Orchidaceae
- Subfamily: Orchidoideae
- Tribe: Cranichideae
- Subtribe: Goodyerinae
- Genus: Lepidogyne; Blume
- Species: L. longifolia

Binomial name
- Lepidogyne longifolia (Blume) Blume

Synonyms
- Neottia longifolia Blume; Spiranthes longifolia (Blume) Lindl.; Lepidogyne minor Schltr.; Lepidogyne sceptrum Schltr.

= Lepidogyne =

Genus of orchids

Lepidogyne is a genus of flowering plants from the orchid family, Orchidaceae. It contains only one known species, Lepidogyne longifolia, native to New Guinea and to Southeast Asia (Philippines, Malaysia, Borneo, Java, Sumatra).

== See also ==
- List of Orchidaceae genera
