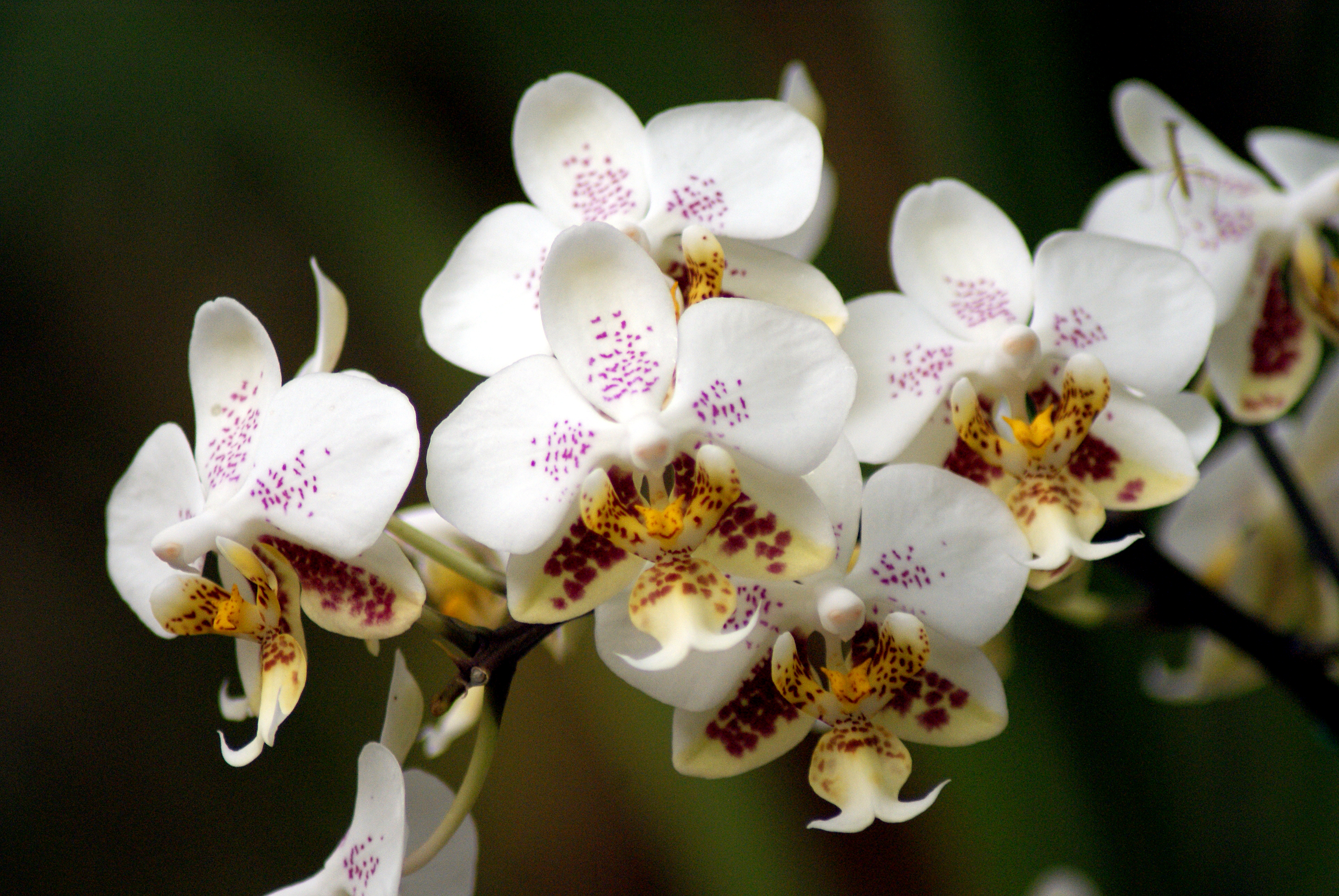

Scientific classification
- Kingdom: Plantae
- Clade: Tracheophytes
- Clade: Angiosperms
- Clade: Monocots
- Order: Asparagales
- Family: Orchidaceae
- Subfamily: Epidendroideae
- Genus: Phalaenopsis
- Species: P. stuartiana

Binomial name
- Phalaenopsis stuartiana Rchb.f.

Synonyms
- Phalaenopsis stuartiana var. nobilis Rchb.f.; Phalaenopsis stuartiana var. punctatissima Rchb.f.; Phalaenopsis stuartiana var. bella Rchb.f.; Phalaenopsis stuartiana f. nobilis (Rchb.f.) Christenson; Phalaenopsis stuartiana f. punctatissima (Rchb.f.) Christenson

= Phalaenopsis stuartiana =

Species of orchid

Phalaenopsis stuartiana is a species of orchid endemic to the island of Mindanao, in the Philippines.
