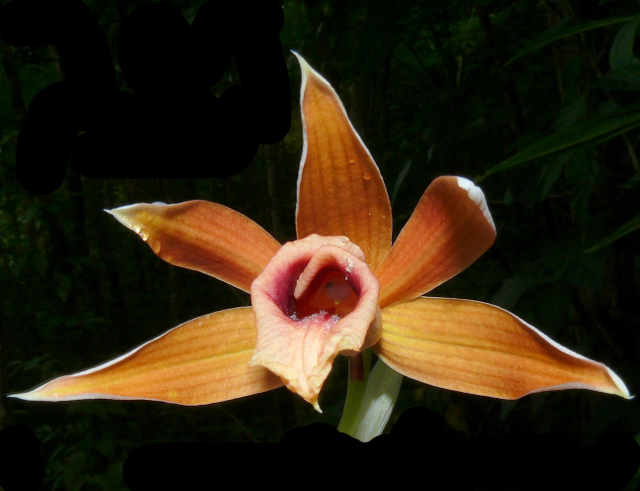

Scientific classification
- Kingdom: Plantae
- Clade: Tracheophytes
- Clade: Angiosperms
- Clade: Monocots
- Order: Asparagales
- Family: Orchidaceae
- Subfamily: Epidendroideae
- Genus: Phaius
- Species: P. antoninae

Binomial name
- Phaius antoninae P.Balzer

= Phaius antoninae =

Species of orchid

Phaius antoninae is a species of orchid in the genus Phaius that was described in 2011 and is native to the Philippines. The type specimen was collected by Antonina G. Balzer in August 1997.
