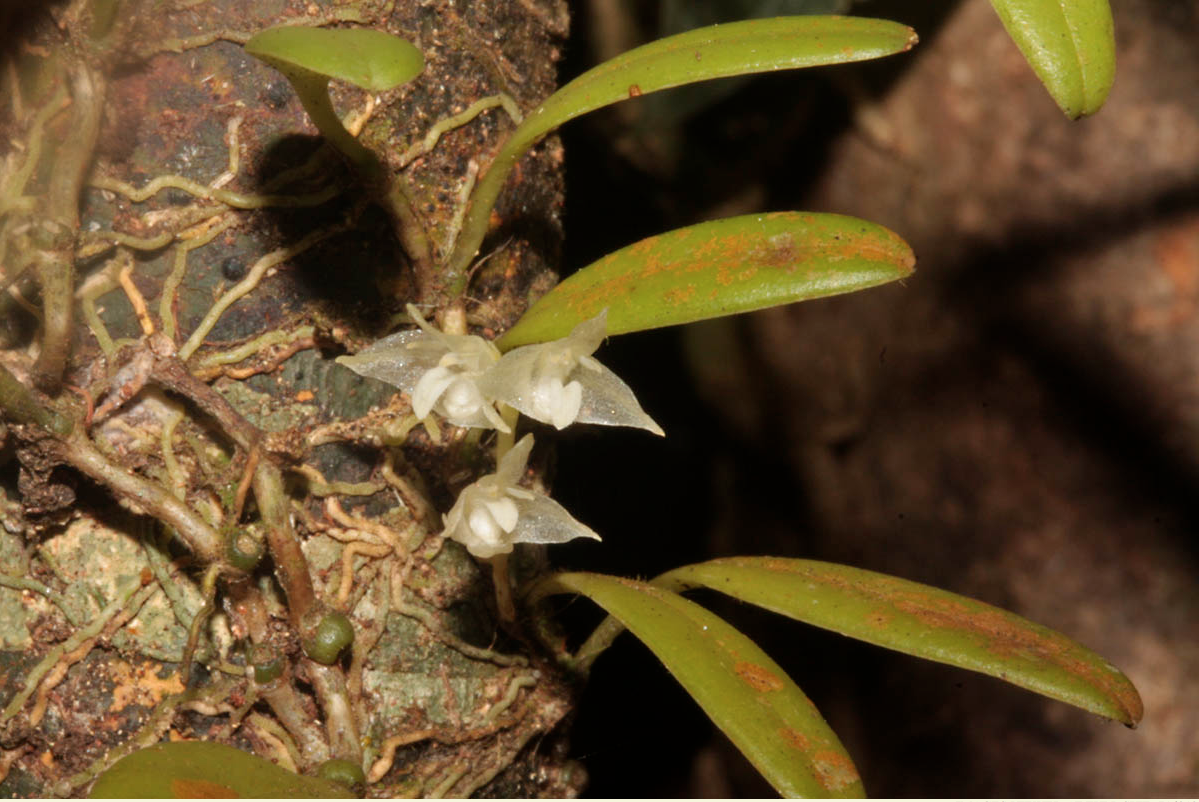

Scientific classification
- Kingdom: Plantae
- Clade: Tracheophytes
- Clade: Angiosperms
- Clade: Monocots
- Order: Asparagales
- Family: Orchidaceae
- Subfamily: Epidendroideae
- Genus: Bulbophyllum
- Species: B. curranii

Binomial name
- Bulbophyllum curranii Ames

Synonyms
- Bulbophyllum aureolabellum T.P.Lin; Bulbophyllum calophyllum L.O.Williams; Bulbophyllum gracillimum Hayata

= Bulbophyllum curranii =

Species of orchid

Bulbophyllum curranii is a species of orchid in the genus Bulbophyllum.
