= Bulbophyllum maculatum =

Scientific classification
- Kingdom: Plantae
- Clade: Tracheophytes
- Clade: Angiosperms
- Clade: Monocots
- Order: Asparagales
- Family: Orchidaceae
- Subfamily: Epidendroideae
- Genus: Bulbophyllum
- Species: B. maculatum

Binomial name
- Bulbophyllum maculatum Boxall ex Naves 1880

Species of orchid

Bulbophyllum maculatum is a species of orchid in the genus Bulbophyllum from the Philippines.
