= Phragmorchis =

Scientific classification
- Kingdom: Plantae
- Clade: Tracheophytes
- Clade: Angiosperms
- Clade: Monocots
- Order: Asparagales
- Family: Orchidaceae
- Subfamily: Epidendroideae
- Tribe: Vandeae
- Subtribe: Aeridinae
- Genus: Phragmorchis; L.O.Williams
- Species: P. teretifolia

Binomial name
- Phragmorchis teretifolia L.O.Williams

Genus of orchids

Phragmorchis is a monotypic genus of flowering plants from the orchid family, Orchidaceae. The sole species is Phragmorchis teretifolia, endemic to the Island of Luzon in the Philippines.

== See also ==
- List of Orchidaceae genera
