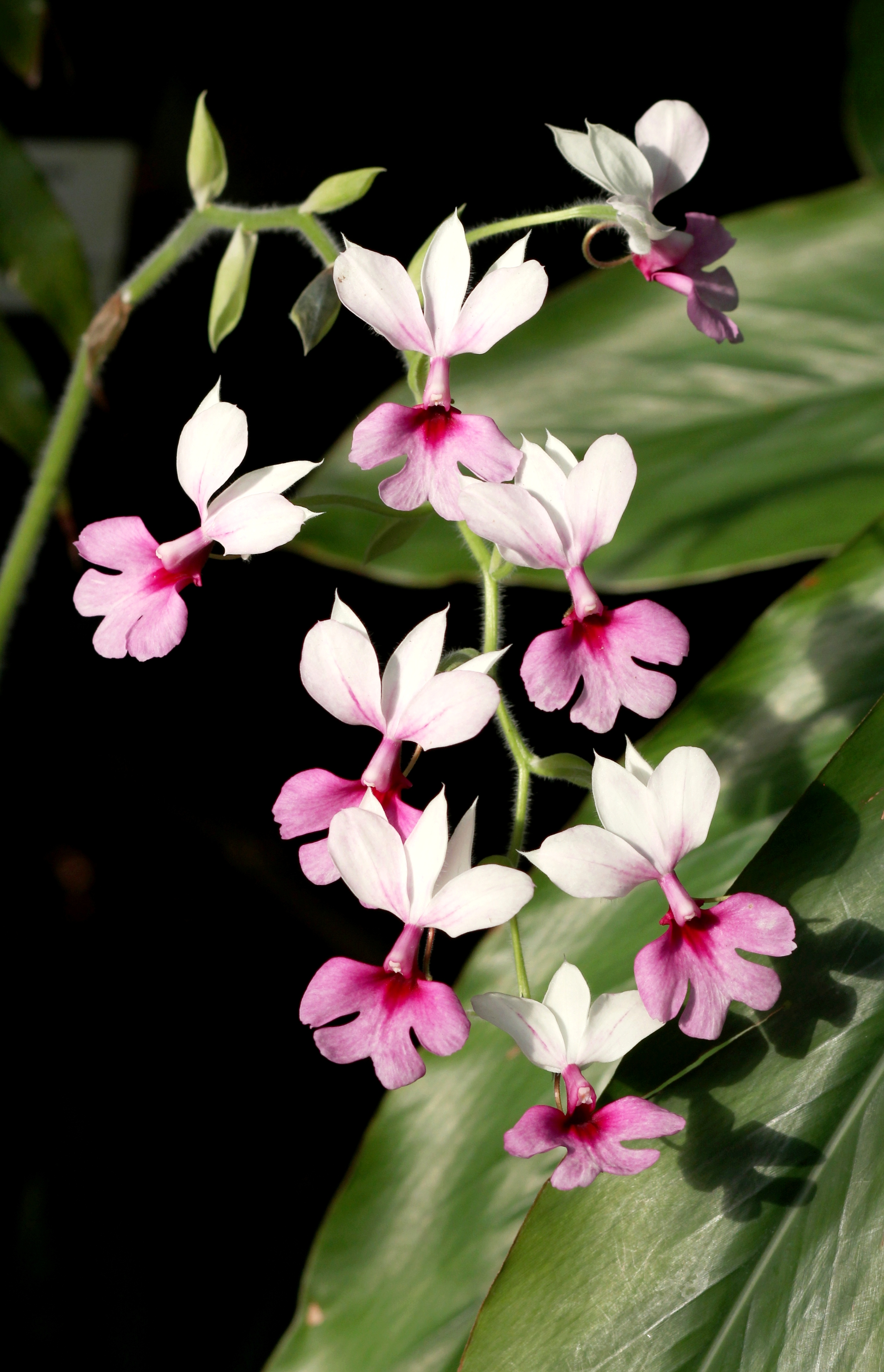

Scientific classification
- Kingdom: Plantae
- Clade: Tracheophytes
- Clade: Angiosperms
- Clade: Monocots
- Order: Asparagales
- Family: Orchidaceae
- Subfamily: Epidendroideae
- Genus: Calanthe
- Species: C. vestita

Binomial name
- Calanthe vestita Wall. ex Lindl. (1833)

Synonyms
- Preptanthe vestita (Wall. ex Lindl.) Rchb.f. (1853); Phaius vestitus (Wall. ex Lindl.) Rchb.f. (1867); Alismorkis vestita (Wall. ex Lindl.) Kuntze (1891); Cytheris griffithii Wight (1851); Amblyglottis pilosa de Vriese ex Lindl. (1855); Calanthe pilosa (de Vriese ex Lindl.) Miq. (1859); Calanthe regnieri Rchb.f. (1883); Calanthe turneri Rchb.f. (1883); Calanthe augusti-reigneri auct. (1894); Calanthe vestita var. sumatrana Schltr. (1911); Calanthe melinosema Schltr. (1925); Calanthe padangensis Schltr. ex Mansf. (1934); Calanthe barberiana Rchb.f.; Calanthe stevensiana Regnier ex Rchb.f.; Calanthe williamsii (T.Moore) B.S.Williams; Calanthe inquilinax Rolfe; Calanthe darblayana God.-Leb.; Calanthe stevensii B.S.Williams; Calanthe hennisii Loher

= Calanthe vestita =

Species of orchid

Calanthe vestita is a species of orchid. It is widespread throughout much of Southeast Asia from Assam to New Guinea including Thailand, Indonesia, Malaysia and the Philippines.
