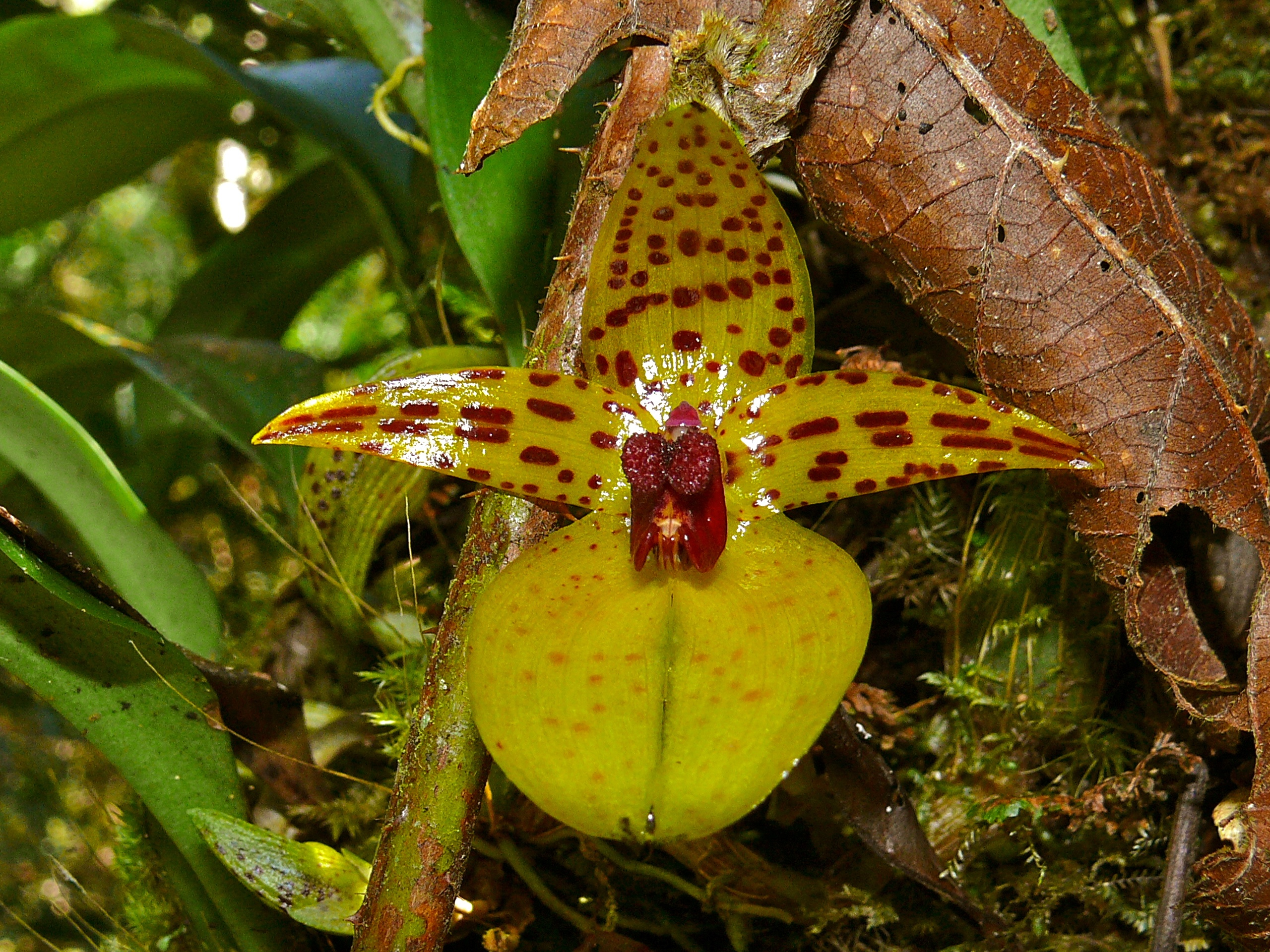

Scientific classification
- Kingdom: Plantae
- Clade: Tracheophytes
- Clade: Angiosperms
- Clade: Monocots
- Order: Asparagales
- Family: Orchidaceae
- Subfamily: Epidendroideae
- Genus: Bulbophyllum
- Species: B. membranifolium

Binomial name
- Bulbophyllum membranifolium Hook. f.

Synonyms
- Bulbophyllum badium Ridl. 1917; Bulbophyllum costatum Ames 1920; Bulbophyllum crista-galli Kraenzl. 1904; Bulbophyllum cryptophoranthoides Kraenzl. 1904; Bulbophyllum insigne Ridl. 1896; Bulbophyllum scandens Kraenzl. 1904

= Bulbophyllum membranifolium =

Species of orchid

Bulbophyllum membranifolium is a species of orchid in the genus Bulbophyllum.
