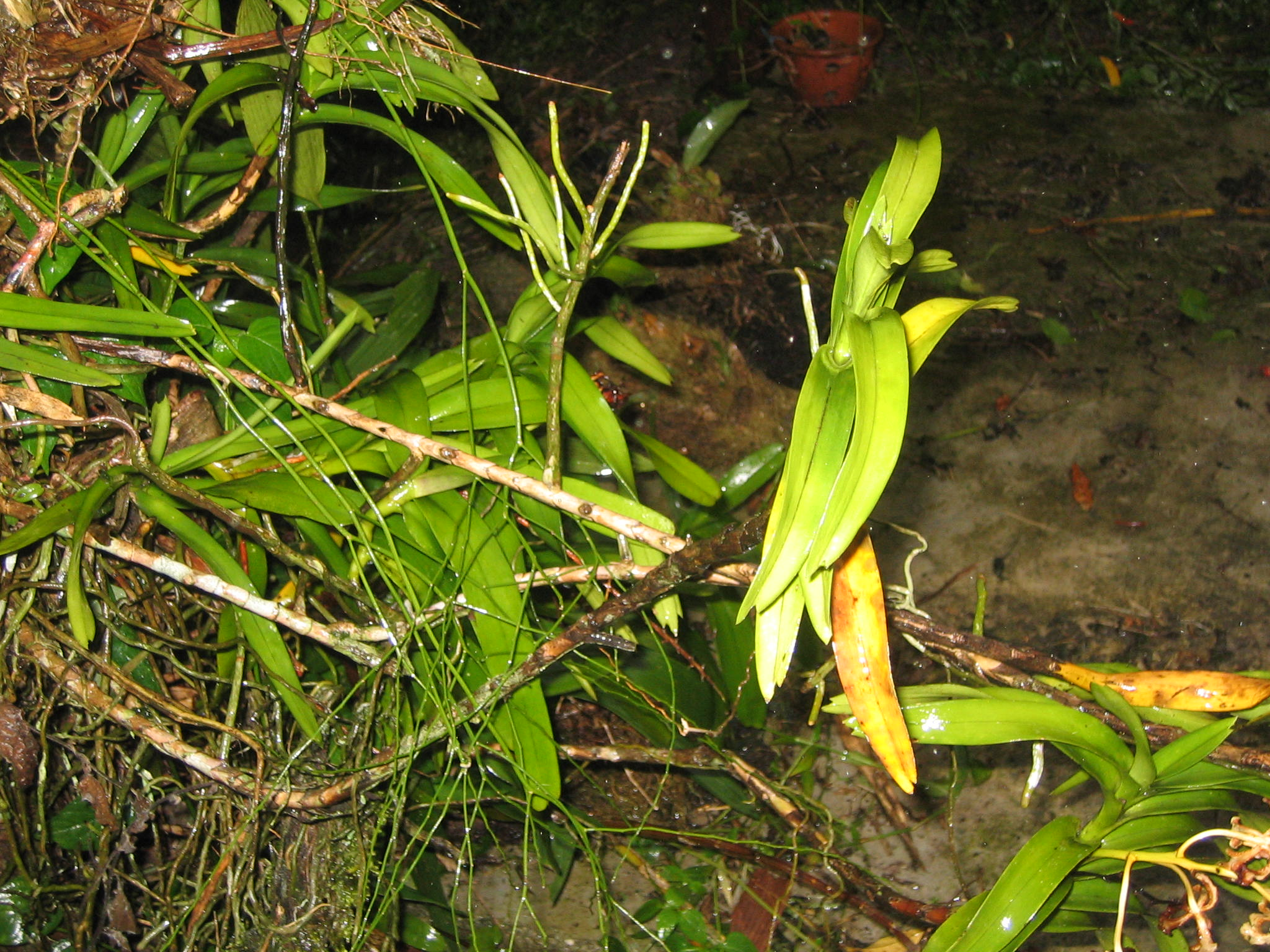
- Arachnis breviscapa

Scientific classification
- Kingdom: Plantae
- Clade: Tracheophytes
- Clade: Angiosperms
- Clade: Monocots
- Order: Asparagales
- Family: Orchidaceae
- Subfamily: Epidendroideae
- Genus: Arachnis
- Species: A. breviscapa

Binomial name
- Arachnis breviscapa (J.J.Sm.) J.J.Sm. (1912)

Synonyms
- Arachnanthe breviscapa J.J.Sm.; Vandopsis breviscapa (J.J.Sm.) Schltr.; Stauropsis breviscapa (J.J.Sm.) Rolfe

= Arachnis breviscapa =

Species of orchid

Arachnis breviscapa is a species of orchid. It is an epiphyte native to Sarawak and Sabah on the Island of Borneo in Malaysia.
