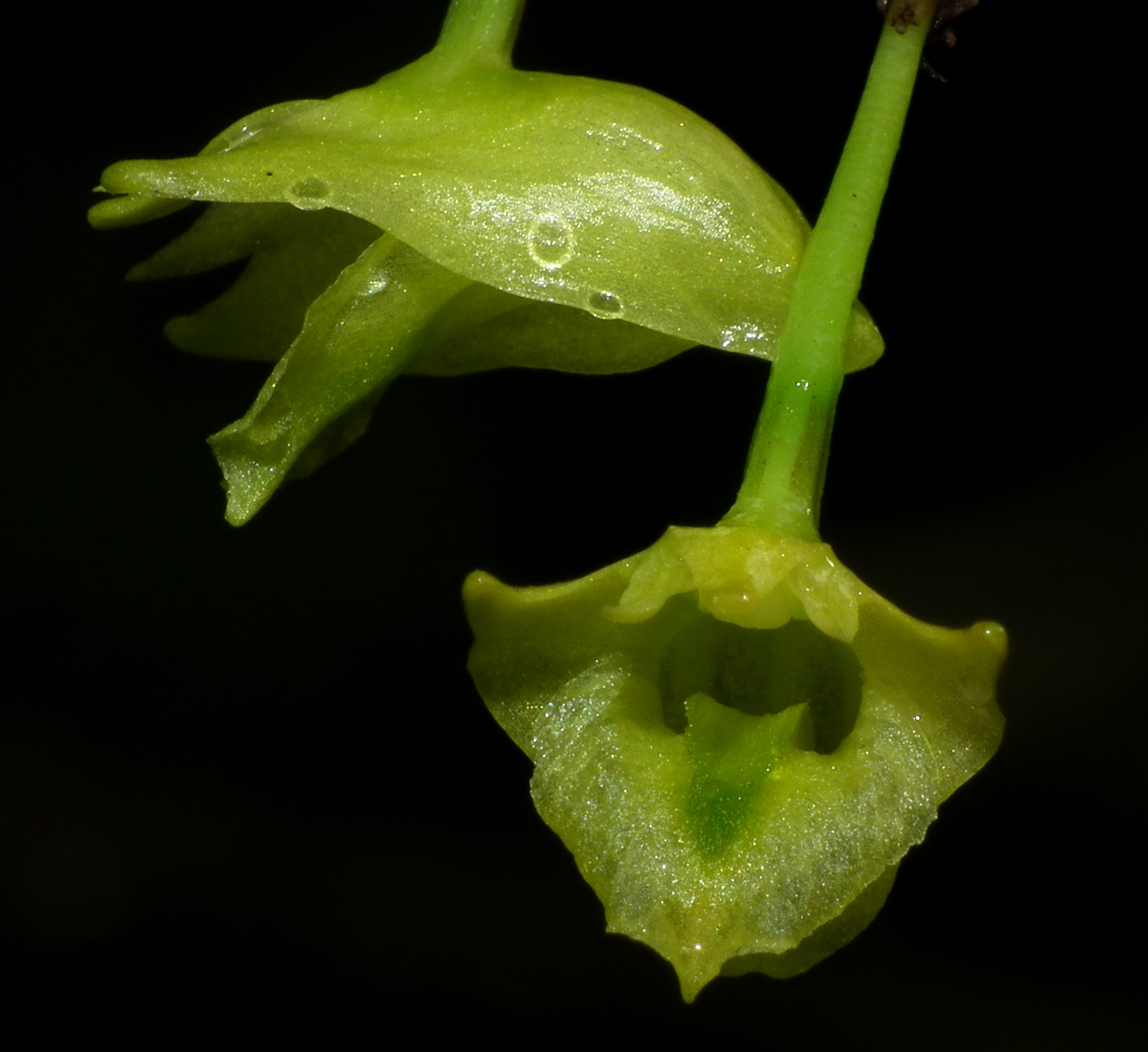

Scientific classification
- Kingdom: Plantae
- Clade: Tracheophytes
- Clade: Angiosperms
- Clade: Monocots
- Order: Asparagales
- Family: Orchidaceae
- Subfamily: Epidendroideae
- Genus: Dendrobium
- Species: D. philippinense

Binomial name
- Dendrobium philippinense Ames

Synonyms
- Ceraia philippinensis (Ames) M.A.Clem.

= Dendrobium philippinense =

Species of orchid

Dendrobium philippinense is a species of orchid in the genus Dendrobium that is native to the Philippines, for which it is named, and also to the Island of Guam in the Micronesia.
