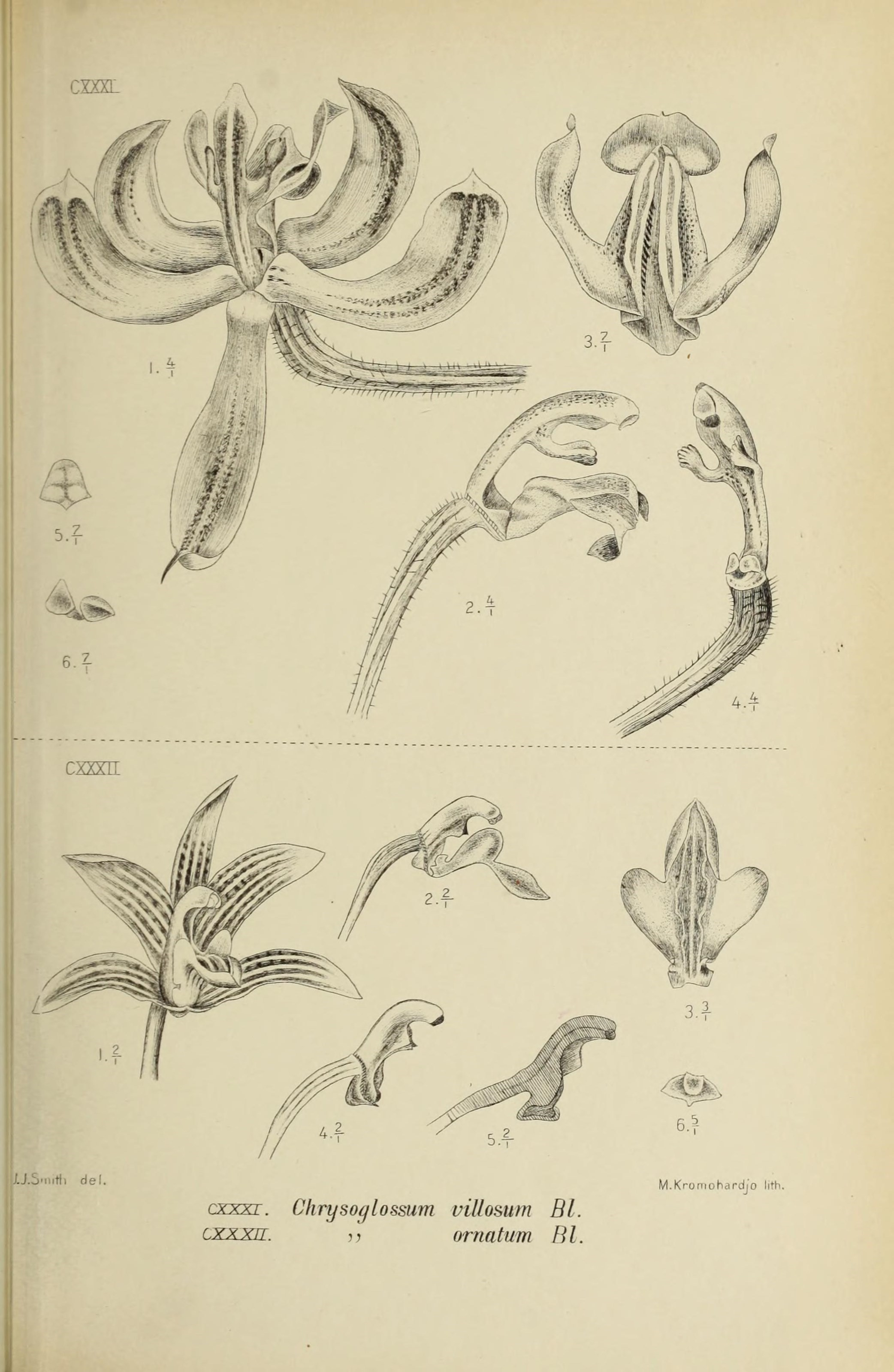
- Pilophyllum villosum depicted above (figure CXXXI)

Scientific classification
- Kingdom: Plantae
- Clade: Tracheophytes
- Clade: Angiosperms
- Clade: Monocots
- Order: Asparagales
- Family: Orchidaceae
- Subfamily: Epidendroideae
- Tribe: Collabieae
- Genus: Pilophyllum; Schltr.
- Species: P. villosum

Binomial name
- Pilophyllum villosum (Blume) Schltr.

Synonyms
- Chrysoglossum villosum Blume

= Pilophyllum =

Genus of orchids

Pilophyllum is a monotypic genus of flowering plants from the orchid family, Orchidaceae. The sole species is Pilophyllum villosum, native to Malaysia, Indonesia, Thailand, the Philippines, New Guinea and the Solomon Islands.
