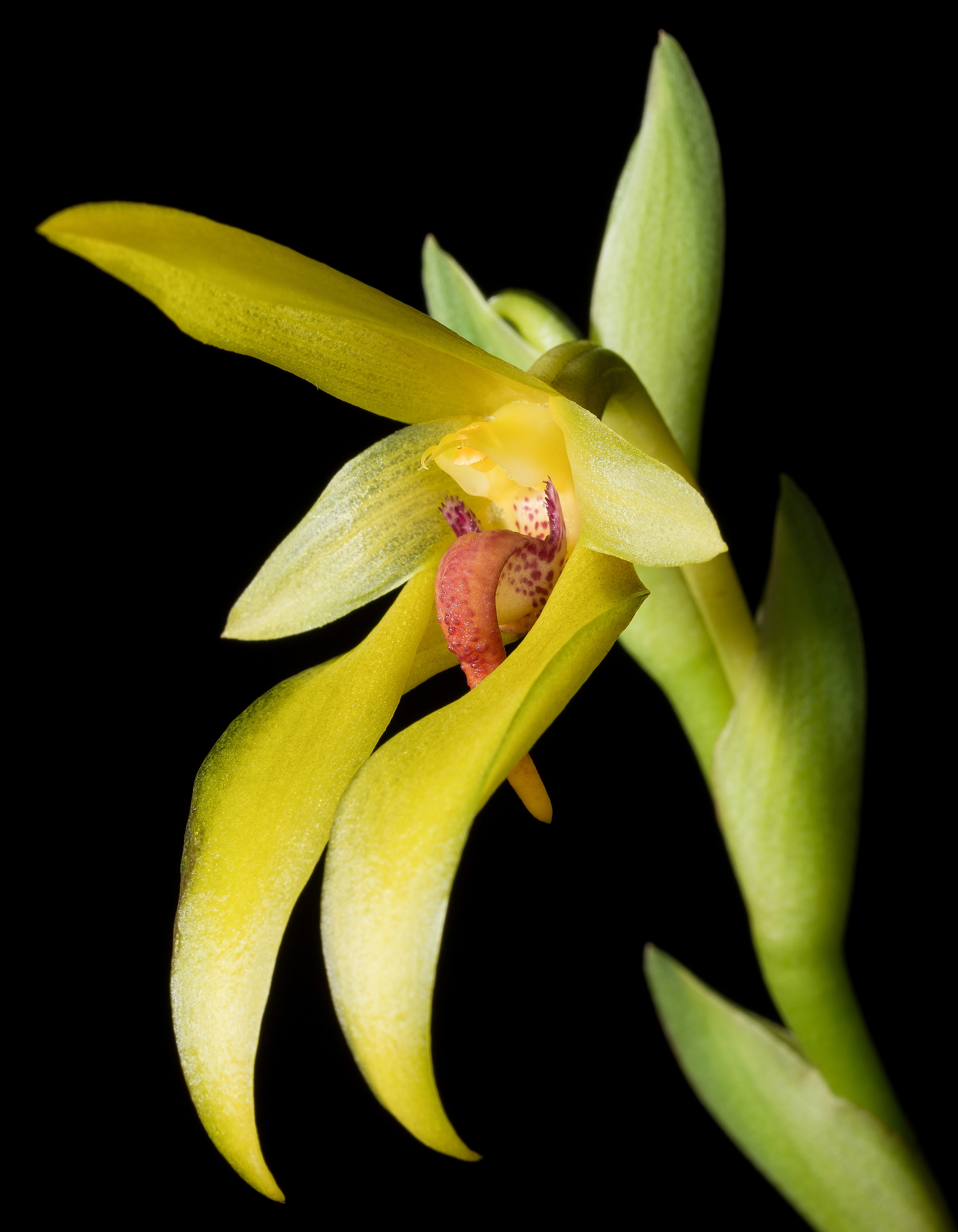

Scientific classification
- Kingdom: Plantae
- Clade: Tracheophytes
- Clade: Angiosperms
- Clade: Monocots
- Order: Asparagales
- Family: Orchidaceae
- Subfamily: Epidendroideae
- Genus: Bulbophyllum
- Species: B. amplebracteatum

Binomial name
- Bulbophyllum amplebracteatum Teijsm. & Binn.

= Bulbophyllum amplebracteatum =

Species of orchid

Bulbophyllum amplebracteatum is a species of orchid in the genus Bulbophyllum.

== Subspecies ==
Image	Name	Distribution
	Bulbophyllum amplebracteatum subsp. amplebracteatum J.J.Verm. & P.O'Byrne	Maluku
	Bulbophyllum amplebracteatum subsp. carunculatum (Garay, Hamer & Siegerist) J.J.Verm. & P.O'Byrne	Sulawesi
	Bulbophyllum amplebracteatum subsp. orthoglossum (H.Wendl. & Kraenzl.) J.J.Verm. & P.O'Byrne	Philippines (Saranggani Island) to Sulawesi.
