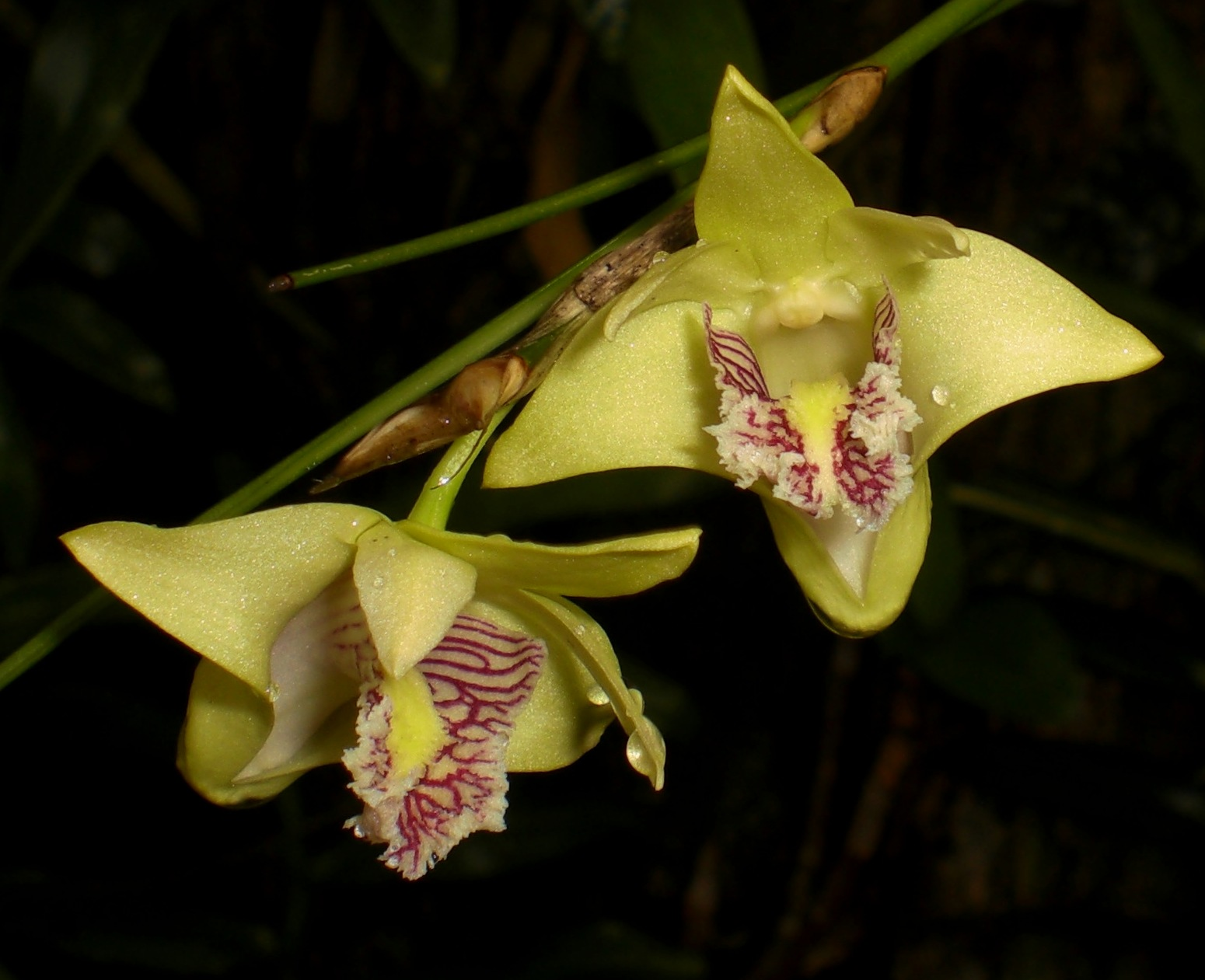

Scientific classification
- Kingdom: Plantae
- Clade: Tracheophytes
- Clade: Angiosperms
- Clade: Monocots
- Order: Asparagales
- Family: Orchidaceae
- Subfamily: Epidendroideae
- Genus: Dendrobium
- Species: D. junceum

Binomial name
- Dendrobium junceum Lindl.

Synonyms
- Callista juncea (Lindl.) Kuntze; Aporum junceum (Lindl.) Rauschert; Ceraia juncea (Lindl.) M.A.Clem.

= Dendrobium junceum =

Species of orchid

Dendrobium junceum is a species of the family Orchidaceae. The plant is native to Borneo and the Philippines.

== Characteristics ==
Dendrobium junceum is a sympodial orchid which forms pseudobulbs. When the life cycle of the mother plant ends it produces little offsets, continuing the life of the plant. The same cycle is used every year. The stem is erect and during the flowering period start from mid-January till late may it forms blooms on its sides with one to two 3.75 cm wide flowers. This monocot has thin, white roots and leads an epiphytic type of life.
