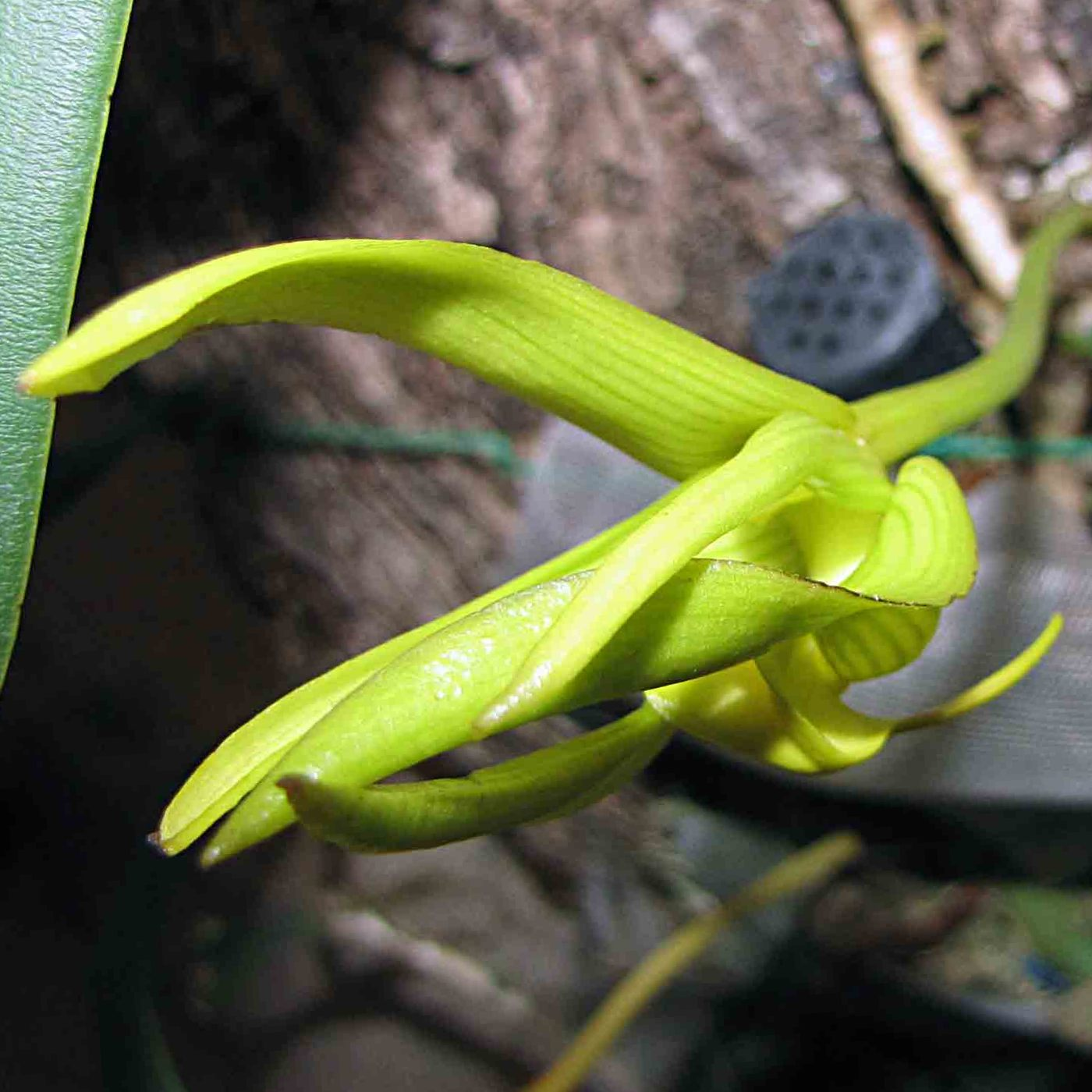

Scientific classification
- Kingdom: Plantae
- Clade: Tracheophytes
- Clade: Angiosperms
- Clade: Monocots
- Order: Asparagales
- Family: Orchidaceae
- Subfamily: Epidendroideae
- Genus: Bulbophyllum
- Species: B. cheiri

Binomial name
- Bulbophyllum cheiri Lindl.

= Bulbophyllum cheiri =

Species of orchid

Bulbophyllum cheiri is a species of orchid in the genus Bulbophyllum.

Found in Malaysia, Sumatra, Java, Borneo, Sulawesi and the Philippines in mangrove woodlands and other lowland forests as an epiphyte and on sea-facing cliffs as a lithophyte at elevations of sealevel to 500 meters as a miniature sized, hot growing epiphyte with 2.4 to 4" [6 to 10 cm] between each cylindrical, short pseudobulb carrying a single apical, erect, oblong, blunt, bilobed, narrowing below into the petiolate base leaf that blooms in the early summer on a basal, erect, [.4" [1 cm] long, single flowered inflorescence with a few basal, imbricate sheaths and carrying fragrant flowers.
