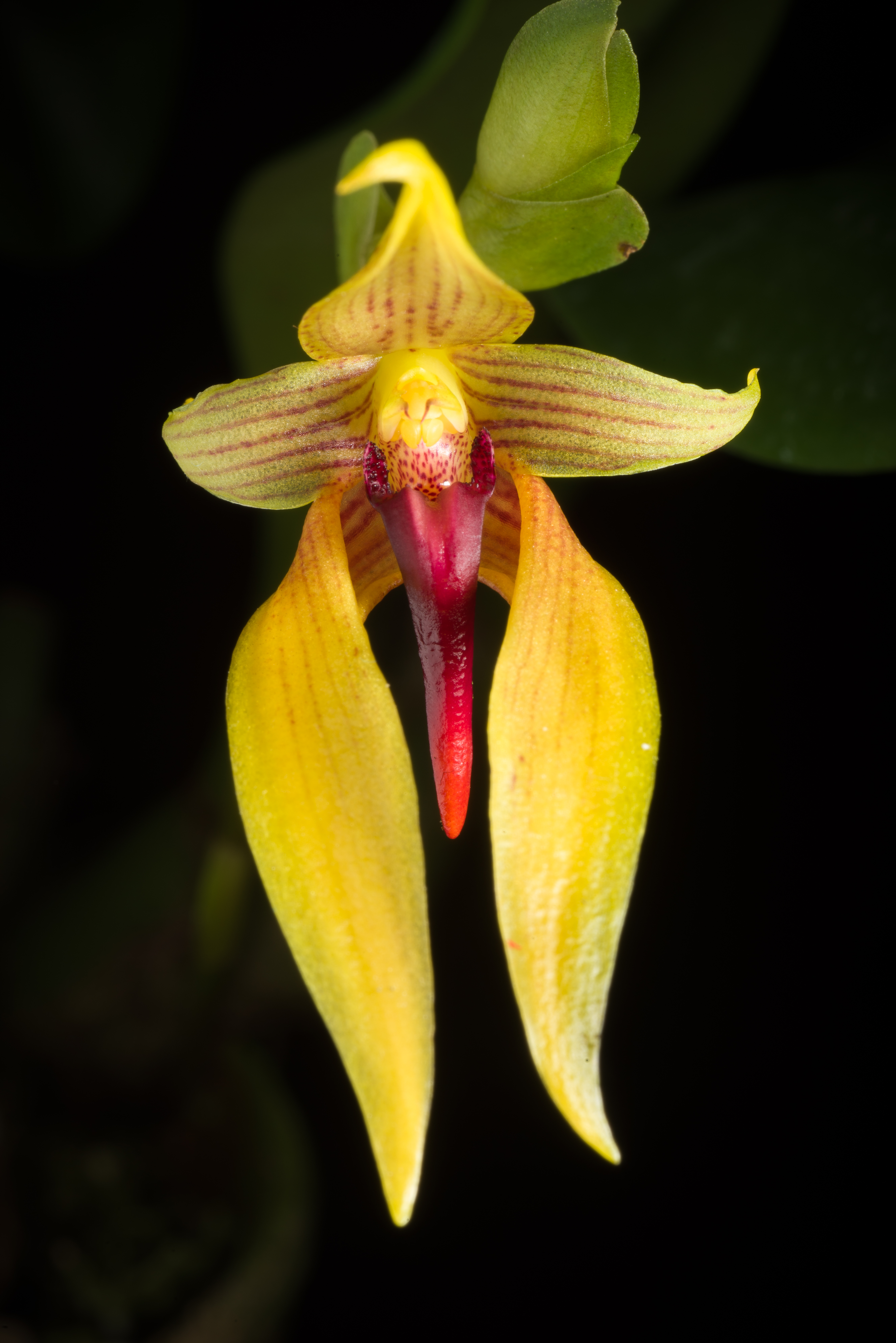
- Bulbophyllum amplebracteatum subsp. orthoglossum

Scientific classification
- Kingdom: Plantae
- Clade: Tracheophytes
- Clade: Angiosperms
- Clade: Monocots
- Order: Asparagales
- Family: Orchidaceae
- Subfamily: Epidendroideae
- Genus: Bulbophyllum
- Section: Bulbophyllum sect. Lepidorhiza; Schlechter 1911

Type species
- Bulbophyllum amplebracteatum

Species
- See text

= Bulbophyllum sect. Lepidorhiza =

Section of flowering plants

Bulbophyllum sect. Lepidorhiza is a section of the genus Bulbophyllum.

== Description ==
Species in this section have creeping rhizomes with verrucate root and a single inflorescence with one or more flowers.

== Distribution ==
Plants from this section are found in Southeast Asia.

== Species ==
Bulbophyllum section Lepidorhiza comprises the following species:

Image	Name	Distribution	Elevation (m)
	Bulbophyllum allotrion J.J.Verm. & P.O'Byrne 2008	Sulawesi	200–1,400 metres (660–4,590 ft)
	Bulbophyllum amplebracteatum Teijsm. & Binn. 1862	Philippines, Malaysia, Sulawesi and the Moluccas	300–1,400 metres (980–4,590 ft)
	Bulbophyllum basisetum J.J. Sm. 1929	Philippines	
	Bulbophyllum comptonii Rendle 1921	New Caledonia	
	Bulbophyllum cootesii Ma. A. Clements 1999	Philippines	400–500 metres (1,300–1,600 ft)
	Bulbophyllum cryptophoranthus Garay 1999	Philippines	
	Bulbophyllum cymbidioides J.J.Verm. & P.O'Byrne 2008	Sulawesi	1,600–2,200 metres (5,200–7,200 ft)
	Bulbophyllum echinolabium J.J. Sm. 1934	Sulawesi and Borneo	600–1,200 metres (2,000–3,900 ft)
	Bulbophyllum exasperatum Schltr. 1913	New Guinea	1,000–1,200 metres (3,300–3,900 ft)
	Bulbophyllum fukuyamae Tuyama 1941	Caroline Islands	
	Bulbophyllum klabatense Schltr. 1911	Sulawesi	200–900 metres (660–2,950 ft)
	Bulbophyllum levyae Garay, Hamer and Siegrist 1995	Papua New Guinea	800 metres (2,600 ft)
	Bulbophyllum mandibulare Rchb.f. 1882	Sarawak & Sabah, Borneo	300–2,100 metres (980–6,890 ft)
	Bulbophyllum mearnsii Ames 1913	Sulawesi, Philippines	900 metres (3,000 ft)
	Bulbophyllum nasseri Garay 1999	Philippines	
	Bulbophyllum novaciae J.J.Verm. & P.O'Byrne 2003	Sulawesi	1,400–1,700 metres (4,600–5,600 ft)
	Bulbophyllum nymphopolitanum Kraenzl. 1916	Philippines	1,000 metres (3,300 ft)
	Bulbophyllum odontoglossum Schltr. 1913	New Guinea	800–1,350 metres (2,620–4,430 ft)
	Bulbophyllum oobulbum Schltr. 1913	New Guinea	200–1,800 metres (660–5,910 ft)
	Bulbophyllum pachyanthum Schtr. 1906	Solomon Islands, New Caledonia, Tonga, Fiji and Samoa	300–1,600 metres (980–5,250 ft)
	Bulbophyllum papulosum Garay 1999	Philippines	0–500 metres (0–1,640 ft)
	Bulbophyllum recurvilabre Garay 1999	Philippines	0–500 metres (0–1,640 ft)
	Bulbophyllum trigonosepalum Kraenzl. 1921	Philippines	500–1,000 metres (1,600–3,300 ft)
	Bulbophyllum tristelidium W.Kittr. 1984 publ. 1985	Papua New Guinea, Solomon Islands	
	Bulbophyllum vanvuurenii J.J. Sm. 1917	New Guinea and Sulawesi	300–500 metres (980–1,640 ft)
	Bulbophyllum veldkampii Verm & O'Byrne 2011	Sulawesi	600–700 metres (2,000–2,300 ft)
