= List of Dendrochilum species =

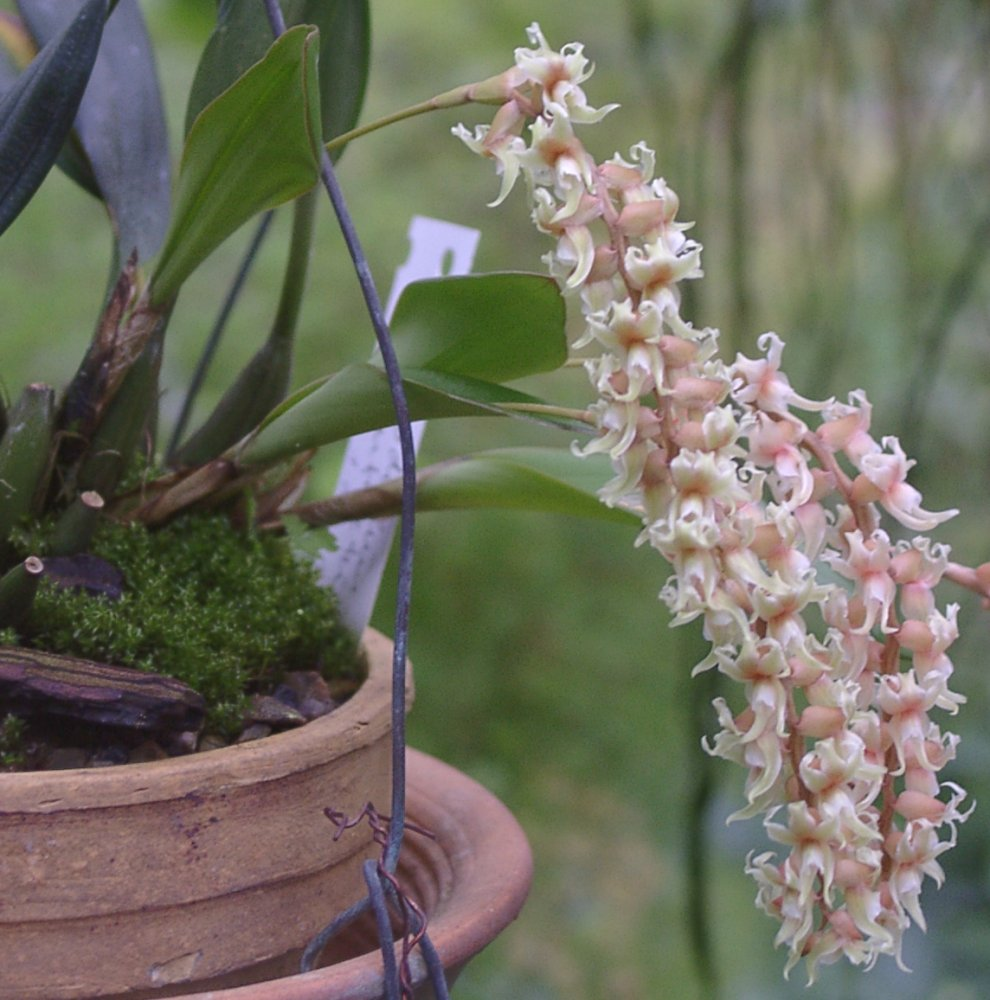
Bent Dendrochilum, Dendrochilum anfractum

Dendrochilum is a genus of orchids (Orchidaceae), containing between 100 and over 300 species according to different sources.

While many authors would accept about 150 species or so, numerous new taxa have become known in recent decades. Thus, in this text the more split-up approach is followed pending more up-to-date information, as it seems that the very low species numbers are certainly gross overlumping, and while the very high numbers presented by some authors are probably a result of oversplitting, they are likely to be closer to the truth.

== A ==
- Dendrochilum abbreviatum Blume (Java)
  - Dendrochilum abbreviatum var. abbreviatum
  - Dendrochilum abbreviatum var. remiforme J.J.Sm.
- Dendrochilum abortum (Ames) L.O.Williams (Philippines)
- Dendrochilum acuiferum Carr (Borneo)
- Dendrochilum acuminatum J.J.Sm. (Sumatra)
  - Dendrochilum acuminatum var. acuminatum
  - Dendrochilum acuminatum var. laxum J.J.Sm.
- Dendrochilum adpressibulbum J.J.Sm. (Sumatra)
- Dendrochilum affine Ames (Philippines)
- Dendrochilum alatum Ames (Borneo)
- Dendrochilum alboviride J.J.Sm. (Sumatra)
- Dendrochilum alpinum Carr (Borneo)
- Dendrochilum ambangense H.A.Pedersen (Sulawesi)
- Dendrochilum amesianum H.A.Pedersen (Philippines)
- Dendrochilum anfractum (Ames) Pfitzer in H.G.A.Engler – Bent Dendrochilum (Philippines)
  - Dendrochilum anfractum var. anfractoides (Ames) L.O.Williams
  - Dendrochilum anfractum var. anfractum
- Dendrochilum angustifolium Ridl. (Malaysia, Sumatra)
- Dendrochilum angustilobum Carr (Borneo)
- Dendrochilum angustipetalum Ames (Borneo)
- Dendrochilum anomalum Carr (Borneo)
- Dendrochilum apiculatum (Ames) L.O.Williams (Philippines)
- Dendrochilum apoense T.Hashim. (Philippines)
- Dendrochilum appendiculatum J.J.Sm. (Sumatra)
- Dendrochilum arachnites Rchb.f. – Spider Dendrochilum (Philippines)
- Dendrochilum asperum L.O.Williams (Philippines)
- Dendrochilum atjehense J.J.Sm. (Sumatra)
- Dendrochilum aurantiacum Blume (Sumatra, Java)
- Dendrochilum auriculare Ames (Philippines)
- Dendrochilum auriculilobum J.J.Wood in J.J.Wood & P.J.Cribb (Borneo)

== B ==
- Dendrochilum bandaharaense J.J.Wood & J.B.Comber (Sumatra)
- Dendrochilum barbifrons Pfitzer in H.G.A.Engler (Sumatra)
- Dendrochilum basale J.J.Sm. (Sumatra)
- Dendrochilum beccarii J.J.Sm. (Sumatra)
- Dendrochilum binuangense Ames (Philippines)
- Dendrochilum brachyotum Rchb.f. (Java)
- Dendrochilum brevilabre Ridl. (Sumatra)

== C ==
- Dendrochilum carinatum Carr (Sumatra)
- Dendrochilum carnosulilabrum J.J.Sm. (Sumatra)
- Dendrochilum carnosum (Ridl.) Holttum (Malaysia)
- Dendrochilum celebesense H.A.Pedersen & Gravend. (Sulawesi)
- Dendrochilum cinnabarinum Pfitzer in H.G.A.Engler (Philippines)
  - Dendrochilum cinnabarinum var. cinnabarinum
  - Dendrochilum cinnabarinum var. sanguineum (Ames) H.A.Pedersen
- Dendrochilum citrinum H.A.Pedersen (Sulawesi)
- Dendrochilum cobbianum – Cobb's Dendrochilum
- Dendrochilum coccineum H.A.Pedersen & Gravend. (Malaysia)
- Dendrochilum complectens J.J.Sm. (Sumatra)
- Dendrochilum convallariiforme Schauer – Two-callused Dendrochilum, Lily-of-the-Valley-like Dendrochilum (Philippines)
  - Dendrochilum convallariiforme var. convallariiforme
  - Dendrochilum convallariiforme var. minor (Ames) H.A.Pedersen
- Dendrochilum cootesii H.A.Pedersen – Coote's Dendrochilum (Philippines)
- Dendrochilum copelandii (Ames) Ames (Philippines)
- Dendrochilum cordatum H.A.Pedersen – Heart-shaped Dendrochilum (Philippines)
- Dendrochilum cornutum Blume – Horned Dendrochilum (Java, Sumatra)
- Dendrochilum corrugatum (Ridl.) J.J.Sm. (Borneo)
- Dendrochilum crassifolium Ames (Borneo)
- Dendrochilum crassilabium J.J.Wood in J.J.Wood & P.J.Cribb (Borneo)
- Dendrochilum crassum Ridl. – Thick Dendrochilum (Malaysia, Borneo)
- Dendrochilum croceum H.A.Pedersen (Philippines)
- Dendrochilum cruciforme J.J.Wood in J.J.Wood & P.J.Cribb (Borneo)
  - Dendrochilum cruciforme var. cruciforme
  - Dendrochilum cruciforme var. longicuspum J.J.Wood in J.J.Wood & P.J.Cribb
- Dendrochilum cupulatum J.J.Wood in J.J.Wood & P.J.Cribb (Borneo)
- Dendrochilum curranii Ames – Curran's Dendrochilum (Philippines)
  - Dendrochilum curranii var. curranii
  - Dendrochilum curranii var. serratoi (Ames) L.O.Williams
- Dendrochilum cymbiforme Ames (Philippines)

== D ==
- Dendrochilum decipiens J.J.Sm. (Sumatra)
- Dendrochilum dempoense J.J.Sm. (Sumatra)
- Dendrochilum dentiferum J.J.Sm. (Sumatra)
- Dendrochilum devogelii J.J.Wood in J.J.Wood & P.J.Cribb (Borneo)
- Dendrochilum devoogdii J.J.Sm. (Sumatra)
- Dendrochilum dewildeorum J.J.Wood & J.B.Comber (Sumatra)
- Dendrochilum dewindtianum W.W.Sm. (Sumatra, Borneo)
- Dendrochilum dolichobrachium (Schltr.) Merr. (Borneo)
- Dendrochilum dulitense Carr (Borneo)
- Dendrochilum duplicibrachium J.J.Sm. (Sumatra)

== E ==
- Dendrochilum ecallosum Ames (Philippines)
- Dendrochilum edanoi Quisumb. (Philippines)
- Dendrochilum edentulum Blume (Java, Sulawesi)
  - Dendrochilum edentulum var. edentulum (Java)
  - Dendrochilum edentulum var. patentibracteatum J.J.Sm. (Sulawesi)
- Dendrochilum elegans Schltr. (Sumatra)
- Dendrochilum elmeri Ames (Philippines)
- Dendrochilum erectilabium H.A.Pedersen (Sulawesi)
- Dendrochilum exalatum J.J.Sm. (Sumatra, Java)
- Dendrochilum exasperatum Ames (Borneo)
- Dendrochilum exiguum (Ames) H.A.Pedersen (Philippines)
- Dendrochilum exile Ames (Philippines)
- Dendrochilum eximium (Ames) L.O.Williams (Philippines)
- Dendrochilum eymae H.A.Pedersen (Sulawesi)

== F ==
- Dendrochilum filiforme Lindl. – Golden Chain Orchid, Thread-like Dendrochilum (Philippines)
- Dendrochilum fimbrilobum J.J.Sm. (Sumatra)
- Dendrochilum flexuosum H.A.Pedersen (Philippines)
- Dendrochilum flos-susannae J.J.Wood (Borneo)
- Dendrochilum foxworthyi Ames (Philippines)
- Dendrochilum fruticicola J.J.Sm. (Sumatra)
- Dendrochilum fuscescens Schltr. & J.J.Sm. (Sumatra)

== G ==
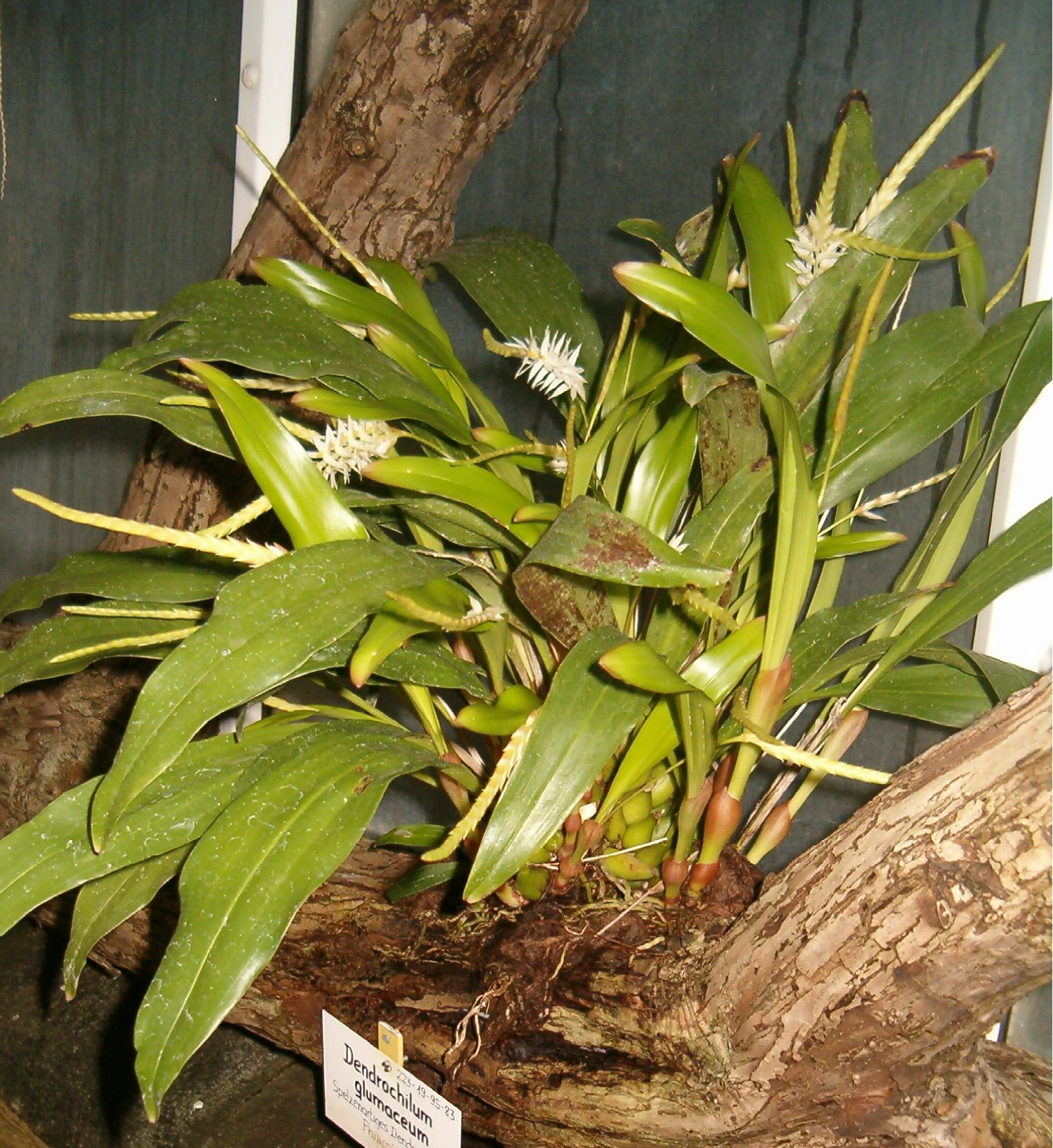
Hay-scented Orchid, Dendrochilum glumaceum

- Dendrochilum galbanum J.J.Wood (Sumatra)
- Dendrochilum galeatum H.A.Pedersen (Lesser Sunda Islands)
- Dendrochilum geesinkii J.J.Wood in J.J.Wood & P.J.Cribb (Borneo)
- Dendrochilum gibbsiae Rolfe (Borneo)
- Dendrochilum globigerum (Ridl.) J.J.Sm. (Borneo)
- Dendrochilum glossorhynchum Schltr. (Sumatra)
- Dendrochilum glumaceum – Hay-scented Orchid, Husk-like Dendrochilum
- Dendrochilum gracile (Hook.f.) J.J.Sm. – Graceful Dendrochilum (Malesia)
  - Dendrochilum gracile var. bicornutum J.J.Wood (Borneo)
  - Dendrochilum gracile var. gracile (Java)
- Dendrochilum gracilipes Carr (Borneo)
- Dendrochilum graciliscapum (Ames) Pfitzer in H.G.A.Engler (Philippines)
- Dendrochilum gramineum (Ridl.) Holttum (Malaysia)
- Dendrochilum graminifolium (Ames) Pfitzer in H.G.A.Engler (Philippines)
- Dendrochilum graminoides Carr (Borneo)
- Dendrochilum grandiflorum (Ridl.) J.J.Sm. (Borneo)
- Dendrochilum gravenhorstii J.J.Sm. (Borneo)

== H ==
- Dendrochilum hamatum Schltr. (Borneo)
- Dendrochilum haslamii Ames (Borneo)
  - Dendrochilum haslamii var. haslamii
  - Dendrochilum haslamii var. quadrilobum J.J.Wood
- Dendrochilum hastatum Ames (Philippines)
- Dendrochilum hastilobum J.J.Wood (Borneo)
- Dendrochilum havilandii Pfitzer in H.G.A.Engler (Borneo)
- Dendrochilum heptaphyllum Kraenzl. in H.G.A.Engler (Sulawesi)
- Dendrochilum hologyne Carr (Borneo)
- Dendrochilum hosei J.J.Wood in J.J.Wood & P.J.Cribb (Borneo)
- Dendrochilum hutchinsonianum Ames (Philippines)

== I ==
- Dendrochilum ignisiflorum M.N.Tamayo & R.Bustam. (Philippines)
- Dendrochilum imbricatum Ames (Borneo)
- Dendrochilum imitator J.J.Wood in J.J.Wood & P.J.Cribb (Borneo)
- Dendrochilum incurvibrachium J.J.Sm. (Sumatra)
- Dendrochilum insectiferum (Ridl.) J.J.Sm. (Sumatra)
- Dendrochilum integrilabium Carr (Borneo)
- Dendrochilum irigense Ames (Philippines)

== J ==
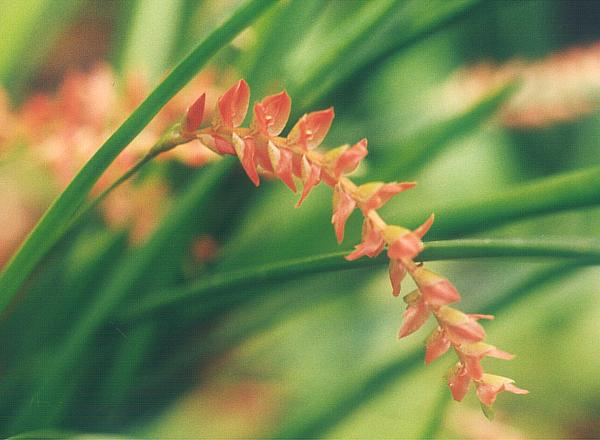
Javier's Dendrochilum (Dendrochilum javieriense) inflorescence Image courtesy of http://www.larsen.twins.dk

- Dendrochilum javieriense L.K.Magrath, G.Bulmer & I.Shafer – Javier's Dendrochilum (Philippines)
- Dendrochilum jiewhoei J.J.Wood (Borneo)
- Dendrochilum joclemensii Ames (Borneo)
- Dendrochilum johannis-winkleri J.J.Sm. (Borneo)

== K ==
- Dendrochilum kabense J.J.Sm. (Sumatra)
- Dendrochilum kamborangense Ames (Borneo)
- Dendrochilum karoense J.J.Wood (Sumatra)
- Dendrochilum kelabitense J.J.Wood (Borneo)
- Dendrochilum kingii (Hook.f.) J.J.Sm. (Malaysia, Borneo to Philippines)
  - Dendrochilum kingii var. kingii (Malaysia, Borneo to Philippines)
  - Dendrochilum kingii var. tenuichilum J.J.Wood (Borneo)
- Dendrochilum korintjiense J.J.Sm. (Sumatra)
- Dendrochilum krauseanum Schltr. (Sumatra)

== L ==
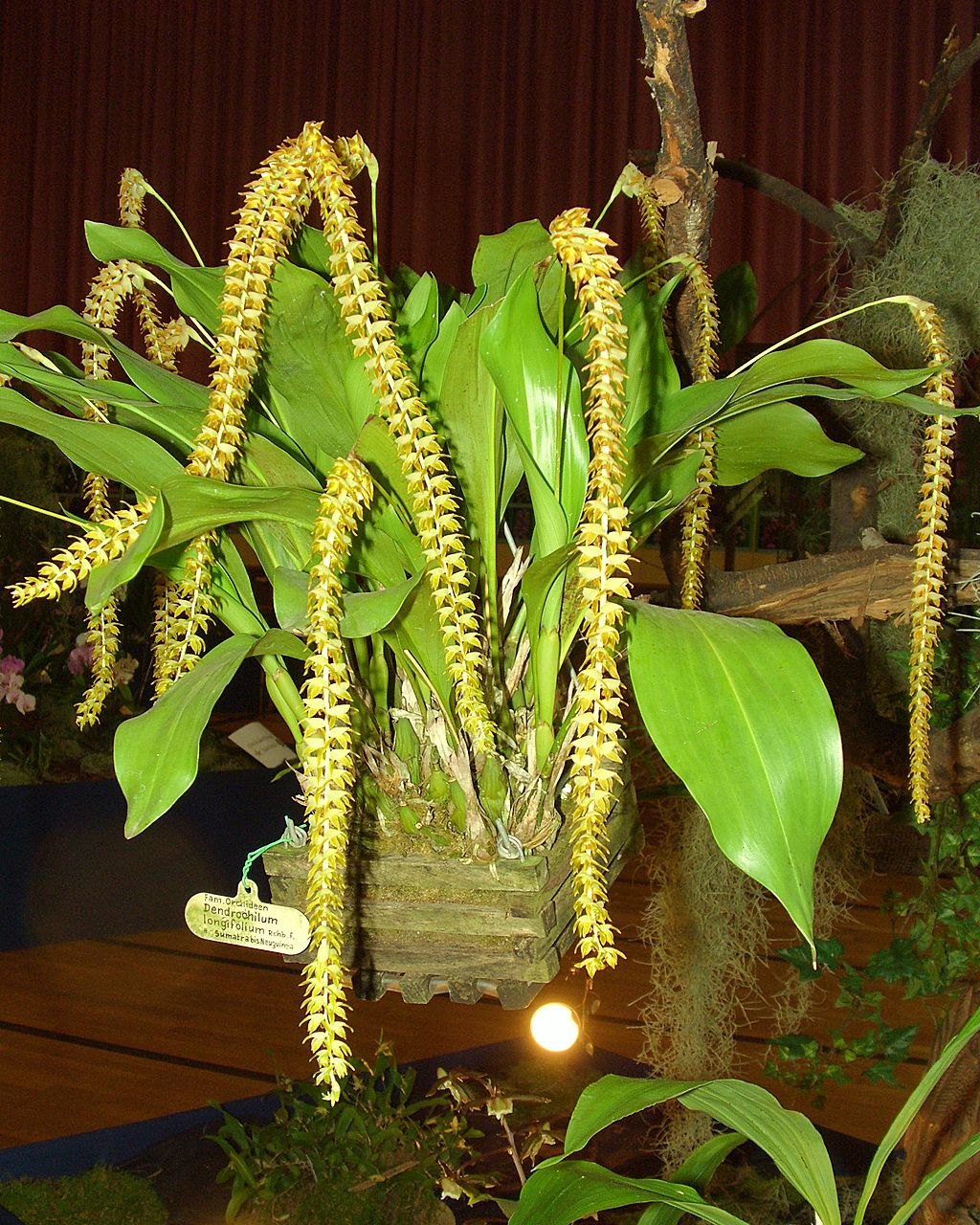
Long-leaved Dendrochilum, Dendrochilum longifolium

- Dendrochilum lacinilobum J.J.Wood & A.L.Lamb in J.J.Wood & P.J.Cribb (Borneo)
- Dendrochilum lacteum Carr (Borneo)
- Dendrochilum lamellatum J.J.Sm. (Sumatra)
- Dendrochilum lancilabium Ames (Borneo)
- Dendrochilum latibrachiatum J.J.Sm. (Sulawesi)
- Dendrochilum latifolium Lindl. – Large-leaved Dendrochilum (Philippines)
  - Dendrochilum latifolium var. latifolium
  - Dendrochilum latifolium var. macranthum (Schltr.) H.A.Pedersen
- Dendrochilum latilobum J.J.Sm. (Sumatra)
- Dendrochilum lepidum Ridl. (Sumatra)
- Dendrochilum leuserense J.J.Wood & J.B.Comber (Sumatra)
- Dendrochilum lewisii J.J.Wood (Borneo)
- Dendrochilum linearifolium Hook.f. (Malaysia, Sumatra)
- Dendrochilum loheri Ames (Philippines)
- Dendrochilum longibracteatum (Kraenzl.) Pfitzer in H.G.A.Engler (Sumatra)
- Dendrochilum longibulbum Ames (Philippines)
- Dendrochilum longicaule J.J.Sm. (Sumatra)
- Dendrochilum longifolium Rchb.f. – Long-leaved Dendrochilum (Indonesia, Malaysia, Borneo, Philippines, New Guinea)
- Dendrochilum longilabre (Ames) Pfitzer in H.G.A.Engler (Philippines)
- Dendrochilum longipedicellatum H.A.Pedersen (Sulawesi)
- Dendrochilum longipes J.J.Sm. (Borneo)
- Dendrochilum longirachis Ames (Borneo)
- Dendrochilum louisianum H.A.Pedersen (Philippines)
- Dendrochilum lumakuense J.J.Wood in J.J.Wood & P.J.Cribb (Borneo)
- Dendrochilum luzonense Ames – Luzon Dendrochilum (Philippines)

== M ==
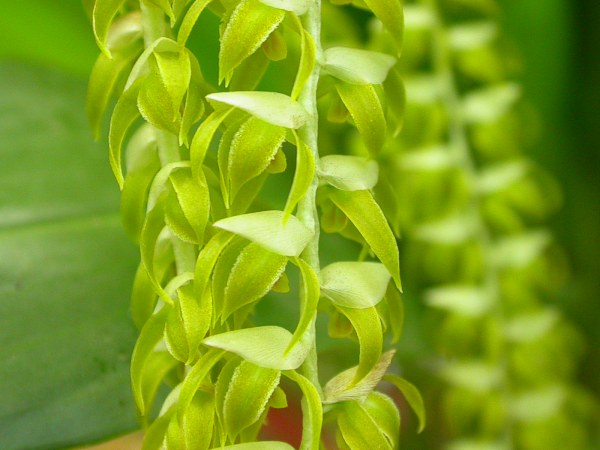
Large Dendrochilum (Dendrochilum magnum) flowers

- Dendrochilum macgregorii Ames (Philippines)
- Dendrochilum macropterum Kraenzl. in H.G.A.Engler (Sulawesi)
- Dendrochilum magaense J.J.Wood (Borneo)
- Dendrochilum magnum _{Rchb.f. in W.G.Walpers} – Large Dendrochilum (Philippines)
- Dendrochilum maleolens Kraenzl. (Philippines)
- Dendrochilum malindangense Ames (Philippines)
- Dendrochilum marginatum (Ames) L.O.Williams – Rimmed Dendrochilum (Philippines)
- Dendrochilum mearnsii Ames (Philippines)
- Dendrochilum megalanthum Schltr. (Sumatra)
- Dendrochilum merapiense Schltr. (Sumatra)
- Dendrochilum merrillii (Ames) Pfitzer in H.G.A.Engler (Philippines)
- Dendrochilum micholitzianum Kraenzl. (Sumatra)
  - Dendrochilum micholitzianum var. longispicatum Schltr.
  - Dendrochilum micholitzianum var. micholitzianum
- Dendrochilum microchilum (Schltr.) Ames (Philippines)
- Dendrochilum microscopicum J.J.Sm. (Borneo)
- Dendrochilum microstylum Schltr. (Sumatra)
- Dendrochilum mindanaense (Ames) L.O.Williams (Philippines)
- Dendrochilum mindorense Ames (Philippines)
- Dendrochilum minimiflorum Carr (Borneo)
- Dendrochilum mirabile J.J.Wood (Sumatra)
- Dendrochilum monodii J.J.Sm. (Sulawesi)
- Dendrochilum mucronatum J.J.Sm. (Borneo)
- Dendrochilum muluense J.J.Wood (Borneo)
- Dendrochilum muriculatum (J.J.Sm.) J.J.Sm. (Sulawesi)
- Dendrochilum murrayi R.S.Rogers & C.T.White (New Guinea)
- Dendrochilum murudense J.J.Wood (Borneo)

== N ==
- Dendrochilum niveum Ames (Philippines)

== O ==
- Dendrochilum ocellatum (Ames) Pfitzer in H.G.A.Engler (Philippines)
- Dendrochilum ochrolabium J.J.Wood in J.J.Wood & P.J.Cribb (Borneo)
- Dendrochilum odoratum (Ridl.) J.J.Sm. (Malaysia, Sumatra)
- Dendrochilum oliganthum (Ames) Pfitzer in H.G.A.Engler (Philippines)
- Dendrochilum ophiopogonoides J.J.Sm. (Sumatra)
  - Dendrochilum ophiopogonoides var. kerintjiense J.J.Sm.
  - Dendrochilum ophiopogonoides var. merapiense J.J.Sm.
  - Dendrochilum ophiopogonoides var. ophiopogonoides (Sumatra)
- Dendrochilum oreophilum (Ames) L.O.Williams (Philippines)
- Dendrochilum ovatum J.J.Sm. (Sumatra)
- Dendrochilum oxyglossum Schltr. (Java)
- Dendrochilum oxylobum Schltr. (Borneo)

== P ==
- Dendrochilum pachyphyllum J.J.Wood & A.L.Lamb in J.J.Wood & P.J.Cribb (Borneo)
- Dendrochilum pallidiflavens Blume (Myanmar, Thailand, Malaysia, Philippines, Borneo, Java, Sumatra, Lesser Sunda Islands)
  - Dendrochilum pallidiflavens var. brevilabratum (Rendle) J.J.Wood (Borneo)
  - Dendrochilum pallidiflavens var. oblongum J.J.Wood (Borneo)
  - Dendrochilum pallidiflavens var. pallidiflavens (Myanmar, Thailand, Malaysia, Philippines, Borneo, Java, Sumatra, Lesser Sunda Islands)
- Dendrochilum panduratum Schltr. (Sumatra)
- Dendrochilum pandurichilum J.J.Wood in J.J.Wood & P.J.Cribb (Borneo)
- Dendrochilum pangasinanense Ames – Pangasinan Dendrochilum (Philippines)
- Dendrochilum papillitepalum J.J.Wood (Borneo)
- Dendrochilum papillosum J.J.Sm. (Sumatra)
- Dendrochilum parvipapillatum H.A.Pedersen (Philippines)
- Dendrochilum parvulum (Ames) Pfitzer in H.G.A.Engler – Small-flowered Dendrochilum (Philippines)
  - Dendrochilum parvulum var. parvulum
  - Dendrochilum parvulum var. strictiforme (Ames) H.A.Pedersen
- Dendrochilum perplexum (Ames) L.O.Williams (Philippines)
  - Dendrochilum perplexum var. montanum (Ames) H.A.Pedersen
  - Dendrochilum perplexum var. perplexum
- Dendrochilum philippinense (Ames) Pfitzer in H.G.A.Engler (Philippines)
  - Dendrochilum philippinense var. philippinense
  - Dendrochilum philippinense var. purpureum (Ames) H.A.Pedersen
- Dendrochilum pholidotoides J.J.Sm. (Sumatra)
- Dendrochilum planiscapum Carr (Borneo)
- Dendrochilum plocoglottoides H.A.Pedersen (Philippines)
- Dendrochilum polluciferum J.J.Sm. (Sumatra)
- Dendrochilum prodigiosum Ames (Philippines)
- Dendrochilum propinquum Ames (Philippines)
- Dendrochilum pseudoscriptum T.J.Barkman & J.J.Wood (Borneo)
- Dendrochilum pterogyne Carr (Borneo)
- Dendrochilum pubescens L.O.Williams (Borneo)
- Dendrochilum pulcherrimum (Ames) L.O.Williams – Very Beautiful Dendrochilum (Philippines)
- Dendrochilum pulogense Ames (Philippines)
- Dendrochilum pumilum Rchb.f. (Philippines)
  - Dendrochilum pumilum var. pumilum
  - Dendrochilum pumilum var. recurvum (Ames) H.A.Pedersen

== Q ==
- Dendrochilum quadrilobum Ames (Philippines)
- Dendrochilum quinquangulare J.J.Sm. (Sumatra)
- Dendrochilum quisumbingianum H.A.Pedersen (Philippines)

== R ==
- Dendrochilum ramosissimum (Ridl.) J.J.Sm. (Sumatra)
- Dendrochilum reniforme Ames (Philippines)
- Dendrochilum rhodobulbum Schltr. (Sumatra)
- Dendrochilum rhombeum J.J.Sm. (Sumatra)
- Dendrochilum rhombophorum (Rchb.f.) Ames (Philippines)
- Dendrochilum rigidifolium J.J.Sm. (Sumatra)
- Dendrochilum rigidulum J.J.Sm. (Sumatra)
- Dendrochilum rotundilabium L.O.Williams (Philippines)
- Dendrochilum rufum (Rolfe) J.J.Sm. (Borneo)

== S ==
- Dendrochilum saccatum J.J.Wood (Borneo)
- Dendrochilum saccolabium Kraenzl. – Sack-lipped Dendrochilum (Philippines)
- Dendrochilum schweinfurthianum (Ames) L.O.Williams (Philippines)
- Dendrochilum scriptum Carr (Borneo)
- Dendrochilum simile Blume (Sumatra, Java, Malaysia, Lesser Sunda Islands)
- Dendrochilum simplex J.J.Sm. (Borneo)
- Dendrochilum simplicissimum J.J.Sm. (Sulawesi)
- Dendrochilum simulacrum Ames (Philippines)
- Dendrochilum smithianum (Ames) L.O.Williams – Smith's Dendrochilum (Philippines)
- Dendrochilum spathaceum Rchb.f. (Java)
- Dendrochilum stachyodes (Ridl.) J.J.Sm. (Borneo)
- Dendrochilum stellum J.J.Wood & J.B.Comber (Sumatra)
- Dendrochilum stenochilum Schltr. (Sumatra)
- Dendrochilum stenophyllum L.O.Williams – Narrow-leaved Dendrochilum (Philippines)
- Dendrochilum subintegrum Ames (Borneo)
- Dendrochilum sublobatum Carr (Borneo)
- Dendrochilum subulibrachium J.J.Sm. (Borneo)
- Dendrochilum sulfureum Schltr. (Sumatra)
- Dendrochilum sumatranum J.J.Sm. (Sumatra)
- Dendrochilum suratii J.J.Wood (Borneo)

== T ==
- Dendrochilum taeniophyllum J.J.Sm. (Sumatra)
- Dendrochilum talamauense J.J.Sm. (Sumatra)
- Dendrochilum teleense J.J.Wood & J.B.Comber (Sumatra)
- Dendrochilum tenellum (Nees & Meyen) Ames – Delicate Dendrochilum (Philippines)
- Dendrochilum tenompokense Carr (Borneo)
  - Dendrochilum tenompokense var. papillilabium J.J.Wood
  - Dendrochilum tenompokense var. tenompokense
- Dendrochilum tenuibulbum (Ames) L.O.Williams (Philippines)
- Dendrochilum tenuifolium (Ames) Pfitzer in H.G.A.Engler (Philippines)
- Dendrochilum tenuissimum Kraenzl. in H.G.A.Engler (Sulawesi)
- Dendrochilum tenuitepalum J.J.Wood in J.J.Wood & P.J.Cribb (Borneo)
- Dendrochilum tetradactyliferum H.A.Pedersen (Philippines)
- Dendrochilum transversum Carr (Borneo)
- Dendrochilum trilobum (Ridl.) Ames (Borneo)
- Dendrochilum truncatum J.J.Sm. (Sumatra)
- Dendrochilum trusmadiense J.J.Wood (Borneo)
- Dendrochilum tuberculatum J.J.Wood & J.B.Comber (Sumatra)
- Dendrochilum turpe (Ames) Pfitzer in H.G.A.Engler (Philippines)

== U ==
- Dendrochilum uncatum Rchb.f. – Hook-shaped Dendrochilum (Philippines, Taiwan)
  - Dendrochilum uncatum var. longispicatum (Ames) H.A.Pedersen – Long-inflorescenced Dendrochilum (Philippines)
  - Dendrochilum uncatum var. uncatum. Rchb.f. – Cucumber-like Dendrochilum, Beautiful Dendrochilum (Philippines, Taiwan)
- Dendrochilum unicallosum L.O.Williams (Philippines)
- Dendrochilum unicorne (Ames) L.O.Williams (Philippines)

== V ==
- Dendrochilum vaginatum J.J.Sm. (Sumatra, Java)
- Dendrochilum vanoverberghii Ames (Philippines)
- Dendrochilum ventricosum J.J.Sm. (Sumatra)
- Dendrochilum vestitum J.J.Sm. (Borneo)
- Dendrochilum viride Seidenf. (Thailand)

== W ==
- Dendrochilum warrenii H.A. Pedersen & Gravend. (Philippines)
- Dendrochilum wenzelii Ames – Wenzel's Dendrochilum (Philippines)
- Dendrochilum wichersii Schltr. (Sumatra)
- Dendrochilum williamsii (Ames) Pfitzer in H.G.A.Engler – Williams' Dendrochilum (Philippines)
- Dendrochilum woodianum Ames (Philippines)

== Y ==
- Dendrochilum yuccifolium (Ames) L.O.Williams – Yucca-leaved Dendrochilum (Philippines)

== Z ==
- Dendrochilum zollingeri Miq. (Java)
