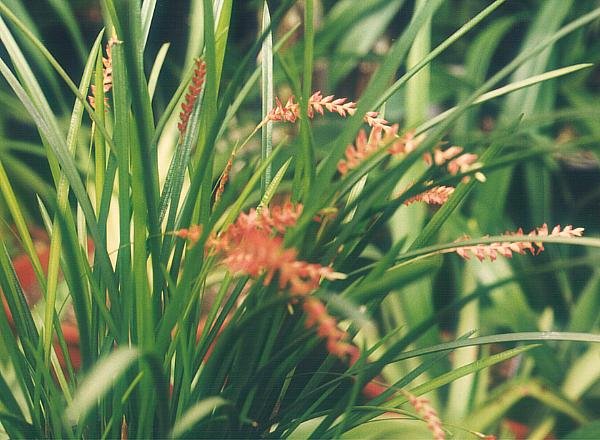
- Javier's dendrochilum (Dendrochilum javieriense) with numerous inflorescences

Scientific classification
- Kingdom: Plantae
- Clade: Tracheophytes
- Clade: Angiosperms
- Clade: Monocots
- Order: Asparagales
- Family: Orchidaceae
- Subfamily: Epidendroideae
- Tribe: Arethuseae
- Subtribe: Coelogyninae
- Genus: Dendrochilum; Blume

Type species
- Dendrochilum aurantiacum Blume

Species
- 100-300, see List of Dendrochilum species

= Dendrochilum =

Genus of plants

Dendrochilum (commonly abbreviated Ddc. in horticulture) was a genus of epiphytic, lithophytic and a few terrestrial flowering plants in the orchid family (Orchidaceae). It is now considered to be a synonym of Coelogyne Lindl. The name of this genus was derived from Ancient Greek words dendron ("tree"), and either cheilos ("lip") or chilos ("green food"), alluding to either the flowers' large lip or to their epiphytic growth. These orchids are popular among orchid collectors.

== Distribution and description ==
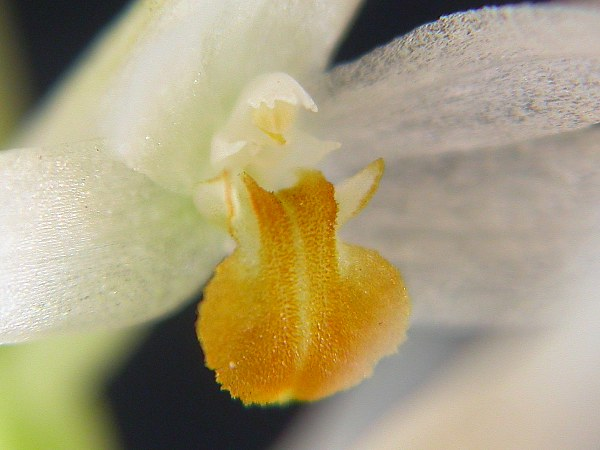
A single flower of the Hay-scented Orchid (D. glumaceum) seen up close

Dendrochilum are distributed at higher elevations in the humid rainforests throughout the Malesian region, with some in the surrounding lands; thus they occur from Southeast Asia to New Guinea. However, most species are found on Borneo or the Philippines.

This genus produces miniature, fragrant, star-shaped flowers that are generally produced in two rows on erect or arching pendant, many-flowered racemes. These inflorescences can grow to a length of 50 cm (20 in) (e.g. in the Hay-scented Orchid, D. glumaceum). The stems are ovoid to cylindrical, striped, sharply reduced pseudobulbs, about 4–10 cm (1.6–3.9 in) long, with green to brown bracts at their base. Each carries one or two tough, erect and lanceolate leaves, usually about 20 cm (7.9 in) long, with narrow petioles. The elliptical leaves of the Long-leaved Dendrochilum (D. longifolium) may grow to a length of 40 cm (16 in).

== Taxonomy ==
The precise number of species is disputed; many websites accept as few as 100 or so, while others recognize far more. For example, the World Checklist of Monocotyledons lists 390 records, including names that have become synonyms. Numerous new taxa have become known in recent decades.

Many of these orchids (67 species in the list used here) were named by Johannes Jacobus Smith, an eminent Dutch botanist. The genus' type species, described by Carl Ludwig Blume in 1825, is Dendrochilum aurantiacum of Java and Sumatra. Several species were formerly separated in Acoridium (established by Christian Gottfried Daniel Nees von Esenbeck and Franz Julius Ferdinand Meyen in 1843) or Platyclinis (established by George Bentham in 1881), but these two taxa are now regarded as synonyms of Dendrochilum.

=== Selected species ===
- Dendrochilum anfractum
- Dendrochilum aurantiacum
- Dendrochilum cobbianum
- Dendrochilum cootesii
- Dendrochilum glumaceum
- Dendrochilum ignisiflorum
- Dendrochilum javieriense
- Dendrochilum longifolium
- Dendrochilum magnum
