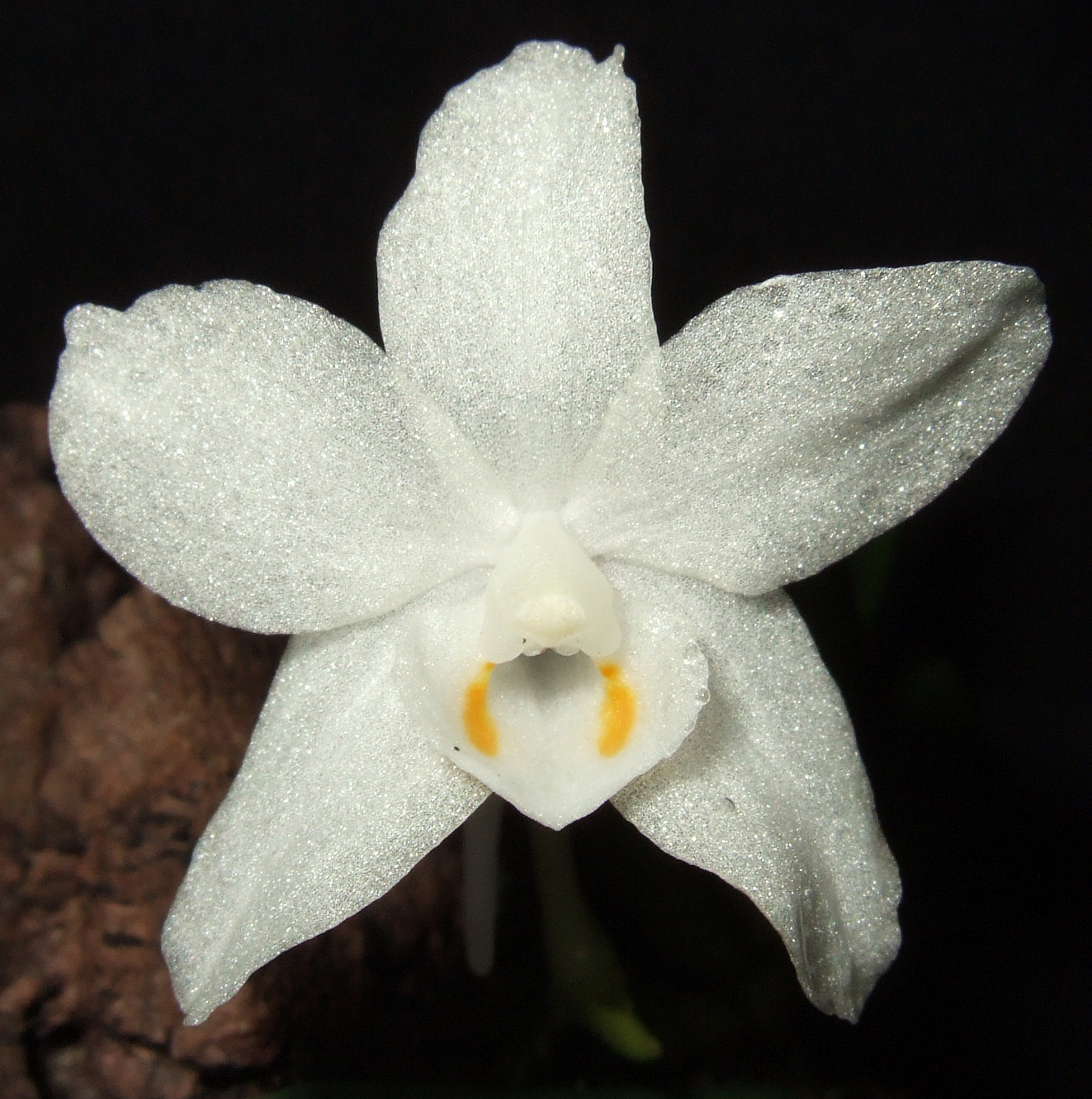
- Flower of Amesiella minor
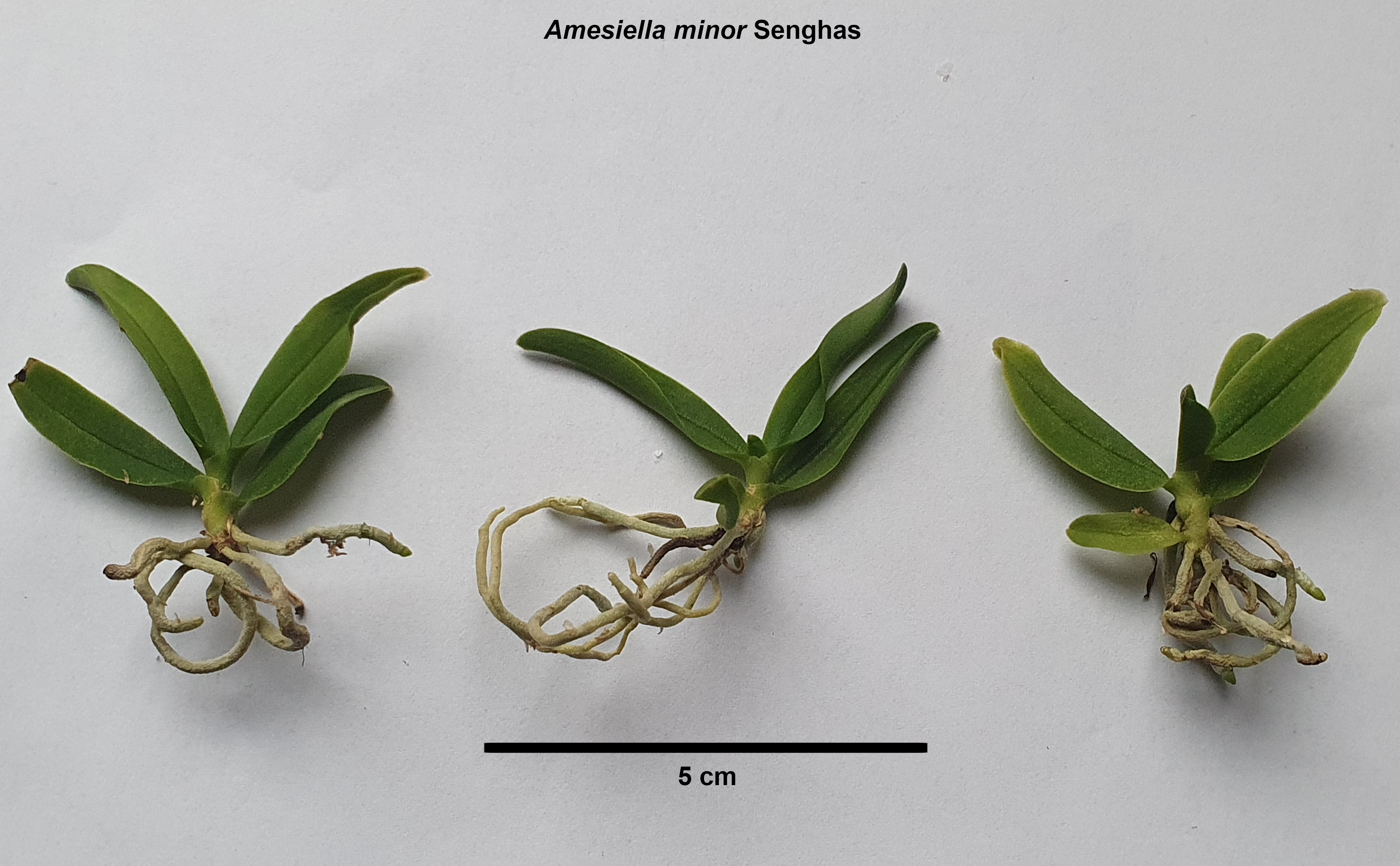
- Three Amesiella minor specimens on a white background with a scale bar

Scientific classification
- Kingdom: Plantae
- Clade: Tracheophytes
- Clade: Angiosperms
- Clade: Monocots
- Order: Asparagales
- Family: Orchidaceae
- Subfamily: Epidendroideae
- Genus: Amesiella
- Species: A. minor

Binomial name
- Amesiella minor Senghas
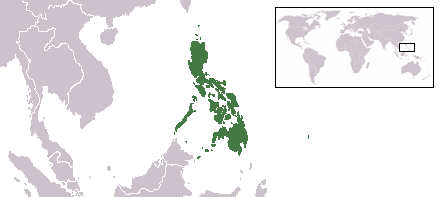
- Distribution of Amesiella minor

= Amesiella minor =

Species of orchid

Amesiella minor is the smallest species of the genus Amesiella. These miniature epiphytic orchids are native to the Philippines.

== Ecology and habitat ==
This species grows on the island of Luzon at heights of 1200 m a.s.l.

== Discovery ==
It was described by the German botanist Karlheinz Senghas in 1999.

== Description ==
These miniature, cool-growing, monopodial herbs form small, leathery leaves. Amesiella has white flowers with long spurs. The morphology of the spur suggests moth pollination. The flowers have two gold coloured, vertical stripes on the lateral lobes of the labellum, which is similar to Amesiella philippinensis. The flowers of Amesiella minor are considerably smaller, which is also referred to in the specific epithet "minor", which means "small" in Latin. Up to 5 flowers with short spurs are formed on 7 cm long racemes.
