= Jim Cootes =

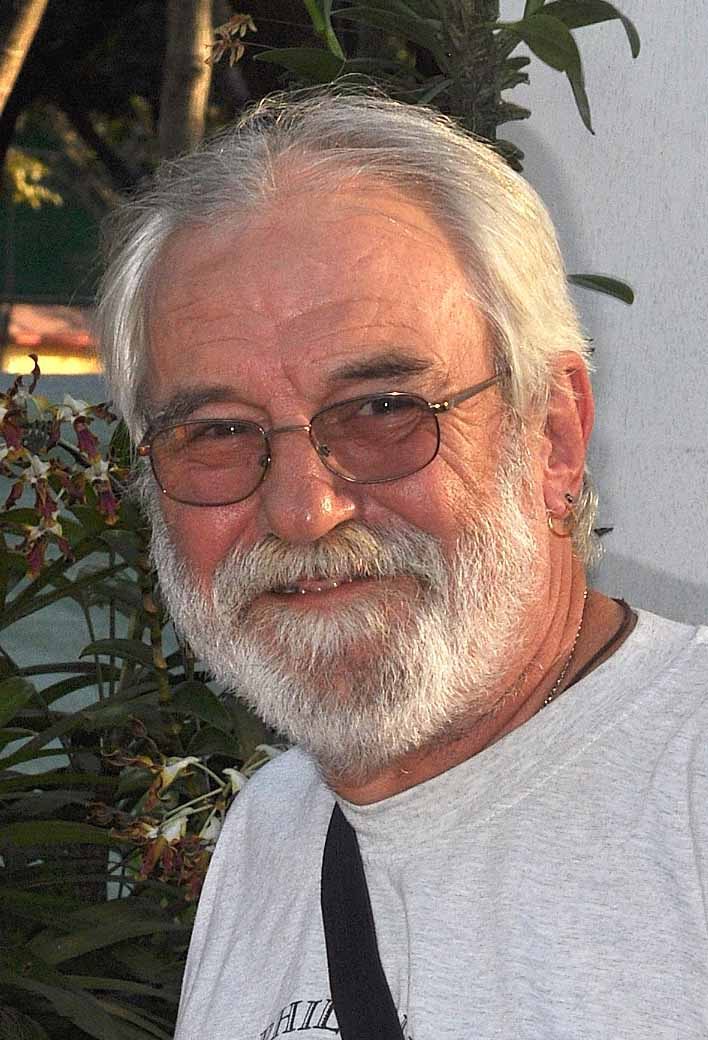
- Jim Cootes
- Born: 17 June 1950 (age 75)
- Occupation: research associate; mail carrier
- Genre: Non-fiction

Jim Cootes For more than twenty-five years, he has been studying Philippine orchids, particularly in the wild, as an amateur Orchidologist in Mindoro, Philippines. He is a frequent lecturer and has written numerous articles for major orchid journals and magazines. He resides in Australia, where he works as a mail carrier.

== Early life ==
Jim Cootes was born on 17 June 1950 in Sydney, New South Wales, Australia.

Cootes was a student of the Australian public school system until he finished high school in 1965. He then went to technical college part-time while he was training as an apprentice machinist. For the majority of his working life, (32 years) he was a civilian employee of the Royal Australian Navy. He now works as a postman for Australia Post, a job he has held for almost 13 years.

Cootes's early years was spent in suburban Sydney, near the Georges River, with his family. Much of this area was bushland and it had many native plants. His interest in orchids started when he was very young. When he was 12 years old, his family moved to a more urban area. Je remained interested in nature and orchids, but as he grew older, work began to take up more of his time and he could no longer spend as much time he once did looking at orchids in the wild.

In the late 1970s, Jim Cootes attended a combined Sydney Orchid Societies show. This started his interest in orchids again, and he went to a book shop in the mall and purchased a book about growing orchids.

In 1977 he made his first trip to the Philippines at the urging of his Filipino workmates. His first trip to the mountains of central Luzon was in 1979 and he was able to get a number of native orchid species, which he was able to import into Australia without any difficulty. The majority of these species could be identified but a few remained without names. He started to collect whatever literature he could find on Philippine orchid species, and in 1984 the most important book, at the time, on Philippine orchid species was published. These books, entitled Orchidiana Philippiniana, contained all the known orchid species in a large two-volume set.

Modern taxonomic works on Philippine orchid species are few and far between. Because of this, Cootes decided to create a database on Philippine orchid species. As the database grew he decided that a book could be made from the information that he had gathered. He started to seriously import Philippine orchid species, and his collection grew considerably.

Many of his plants remained unidentified and this got him interested in doing the descriptions himself. He purchased numerous books that explained the shapes of leaves, floral segments, and other characteristics. In 1998, he and his friend David Banks described and named Amesiella monticola. He did not name any more species for some considerable time. In fact it was not until 2007 that he co-authored another orchid species, Malleola eburnea, with a Filipino colleague, Wally Suarez. Since then they have named numerous species, and made many new taxonomic combinations.

The Orchids of the Philippines (2001) took Jim Cootes over ten years to write. He lived in the Philippines between 1997 and 2000 to do field work and further studies for the book. This book was finally published in 2001 and contained 338 species, all illustrated with colour images and a description of the plant and flower.

Jim Cootes continued to add species to the first book, and in 2011, with almost 800 species, Philippine Native Orchid Species was published. Again all the described species are illustrated with a colour image.

He has written countless articles over many years about orchids, particularly Asian orchids, and many on Philippine species.

== Notable works ==
- The Orchids of the Philippines (2001)
- Philippine Native Orchid Species (2009)

== Orchid Species Named After Jim Cootes ==
- Cylindrolobus cootesii (syn. Eria cootesii)
- Thrixspermum cootesii
- Pseudacoridium cootesii
- Macropodanthus cootesii
- Bulbophyllum cootesii
- Dendrochilum cootesii
