= The Orchids of the Philippines =

2001 book by Jim Cootes

Orchids of the philippines
- Author: Jim Cootes
- Language: English
- Genre: Nonfiction
- Publisher: Timber Press, Incorporated
- Publication date: 2001
- Publication place: Philippines

Orchids of the Philippines is a book by Jim Cootes which was the first to document all existing Filipino orchid species.

== History ==
Jim Cootes is an Australian orchid enthusiast who is the foremost expert on orchids of the Philippines. He did field work in the Philippines from 1997 and 2000 as part of his research for the book. The book is an important guide for researchers, orchid collectors and botanists in the field of endemic orchid species.

== See also ==
- Orchids of the Philippines
