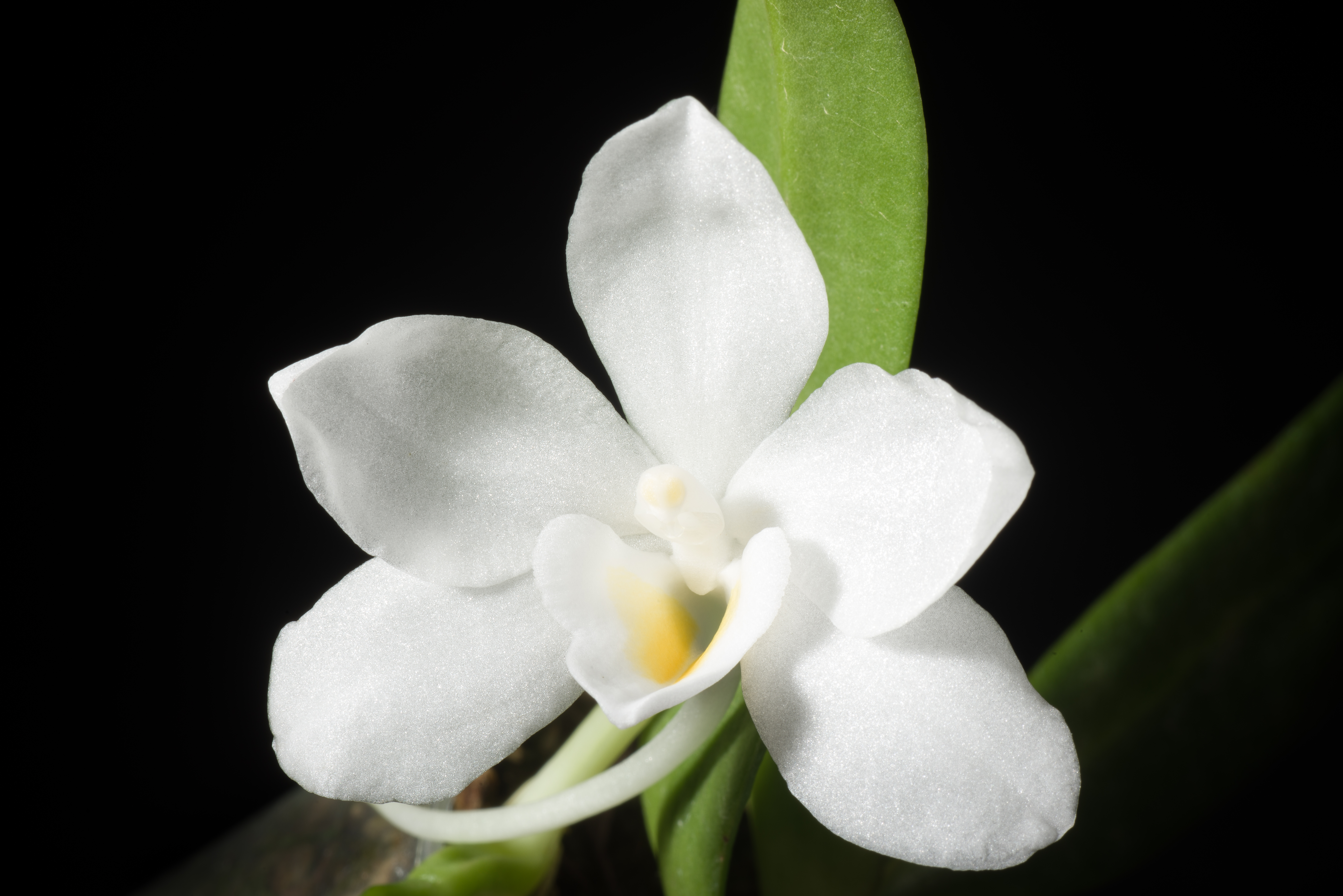

Conservation status
- Endangered (IUCN 3.1)

Scientific classification
- Kingdom: Plantae
- Clade: Tracheophytes
- Clade: Angiosperms
- Clade: Monocots
- Order: Asparagales
- Family: Orchidaceae
- Subfamily: Epidendroideae
- Genus: Amesiella
- Species: A. philippinensis

Binomial name
- Amesiella philippinensis (Ames) Garay

Synonyms
- Angraecum philippinense Ames

= Amesiella philippinensis =

Species of orchid

Amesiella philippinensis is a species of orchid endemic to the Island of Luzon in the Philippines. Like Vanda falcata it was mistaken as an Angraecum species, due to the white, long-spurred flowers. The plant produces rounded leaces up to 5 cm in length. Three or four white, fragrant flowers of 3 cm in width are produced on short inflorescences. The labellum is yellow in the throat. It occurs at lower altitudes than Amesiella monticola and has a shorter spur.

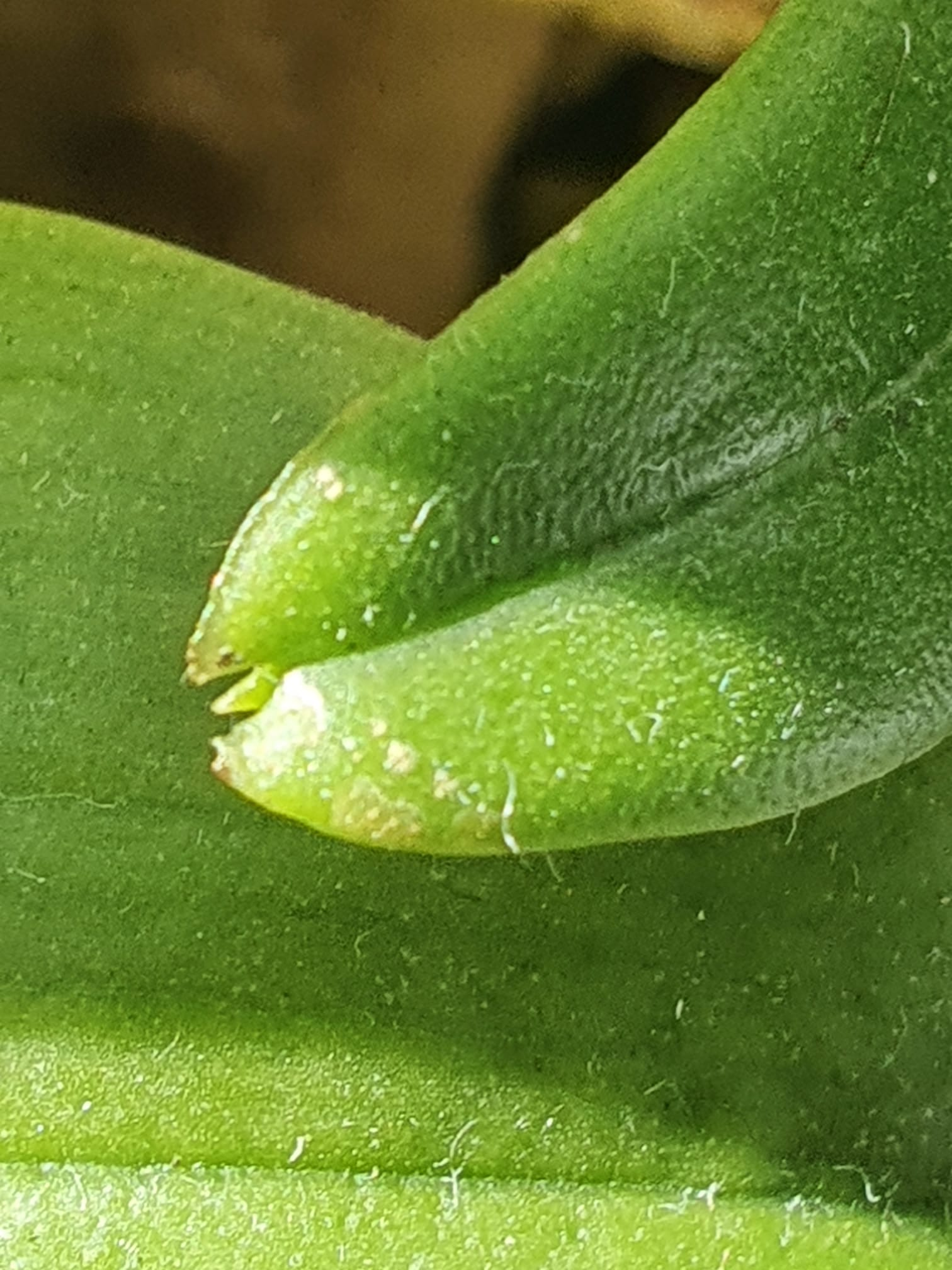
three-pointed leaf tip of Amesiella philippinensis
