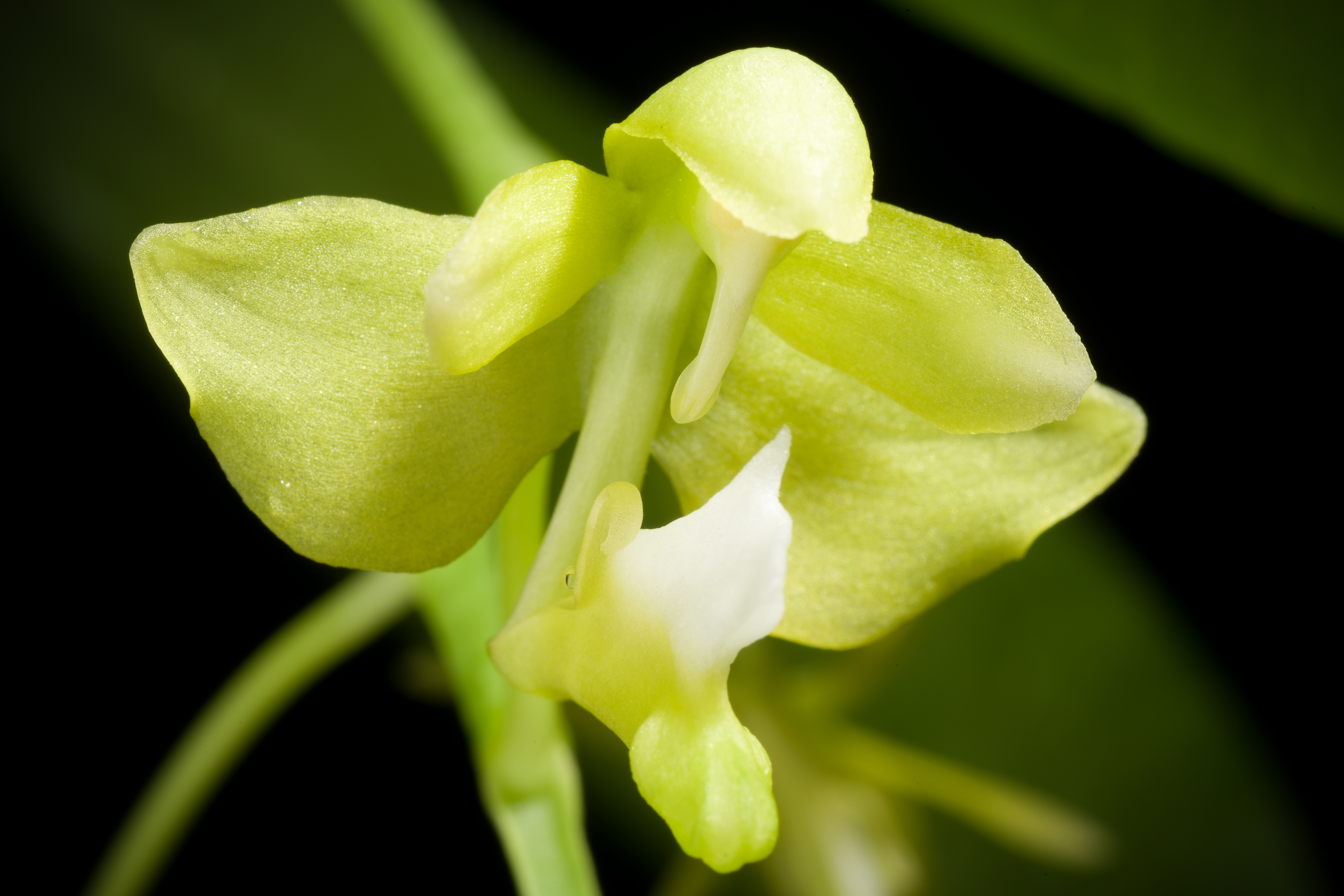

Scientific classification
- Kingdom: Plantae
- Clade: Tracheophytes
- Clade: Angiosperms
- Clade: Monocots
- Order: Asparagales
- Family: Orchidaceae
- Subfamily: Epidendroideae
- Genus: Macropodanthus
- Species: M. cootesii

Binomial name
- Macropodanthus cootesii Tiong

= Macropodanthus cootesii =

Species of orchid

Macropodanthus cootesii, known as Cootes' macropodanthus, is a species from the family Orchidaceae that is endemic to the Philippines. It is named after Australian Orchid Enthusiast Jim Cootes. Macropodanthus cootesii was only described in December 2010, by Dr. George Tiong, in the German journal Die Orchidee.
