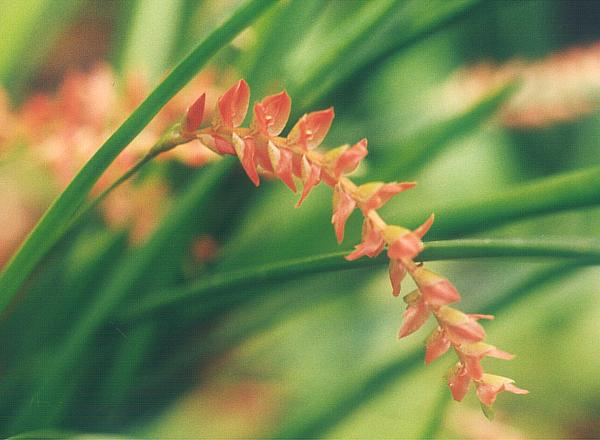

Scientific classification
- Kingdom: Plantae
- Clade: Tracheophytes
- Clade: Angiosperms
- Clade: Monocots
- Order: Asparagales
- Family: Orchidaceae
- Subfamily: Epidendroideae
- Tribe: Arethuseae
- Genus: Coelogyne
- Species: C. javieriana

Binomial name
- Coelogyne javieriana (L. K. Magrath, G. Bulmer & I. Shafer) M.W.Chase & Schuit.

Synonyms
- Dendrochilum javierianum L. K. Magrath, G. Bulmer & I. Shafer

= Coelogyne javieriana =

Javier's dendrochilum

Species of orchid

Coelogyne javieriana is a species of orchid, commonly known as Javier's dendrochilum. It is endemic to the island of Luzon in the Philippines.

== Description ==
This species is a small growing epiphyte. It grows in tropical forests and produces long sprays of yellow or orange flowers that are about one half inch wide.

== Taxonomy ==
This species was previously a member of the genus Dendrochilum until that genus was merged into Coelogyne. It was named by Jim Cootes after his friend Mr. Elias Javier.
