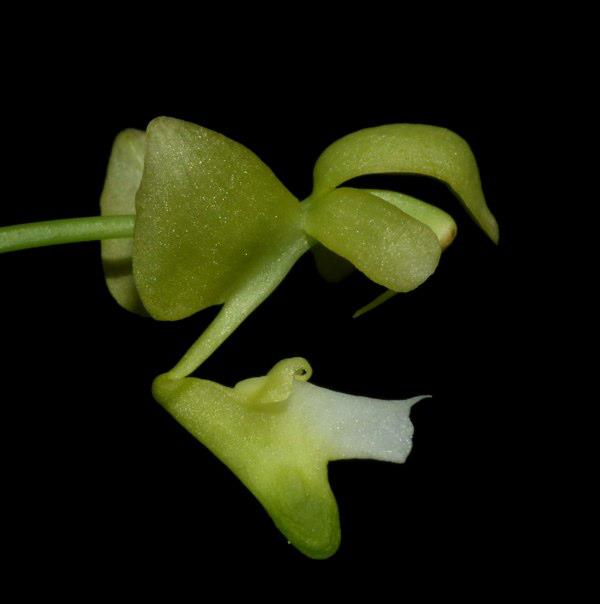
- Macropodanthus cootesii

Scientific classification
- Kingdom: Plantae
- Clade: Tracheophytes
- Clade: Angiosperms
- Clade: Monocots
- Order: Asparagales
- Family: Orchidaceae
- Subfamily: Epidendroideae
- Tribe: Vandeae
- Subtribe: Aeridinae
- Genus: Macropodanthus; L.O.Williams, Bot. Mus. Leafl. 6: 103 (1938)

Species
- Macropodanthus alatus; Macropodanthus berkeleyi; Macropodanthus cootesii; Macropodanthus membraniferus; Macropodanthus nayanianum; Macropodanthus philippinensis; Macropodanthus rimauensis; Macropodanthus sabahensis; Macropodanthus teysmannii

= Macropodanthus =

Genus of orchids

Macropodanthus is a genus of flowering plants from the orchid family, Orchidaceae.

== See also ==
- List of Orchidaceae genera
