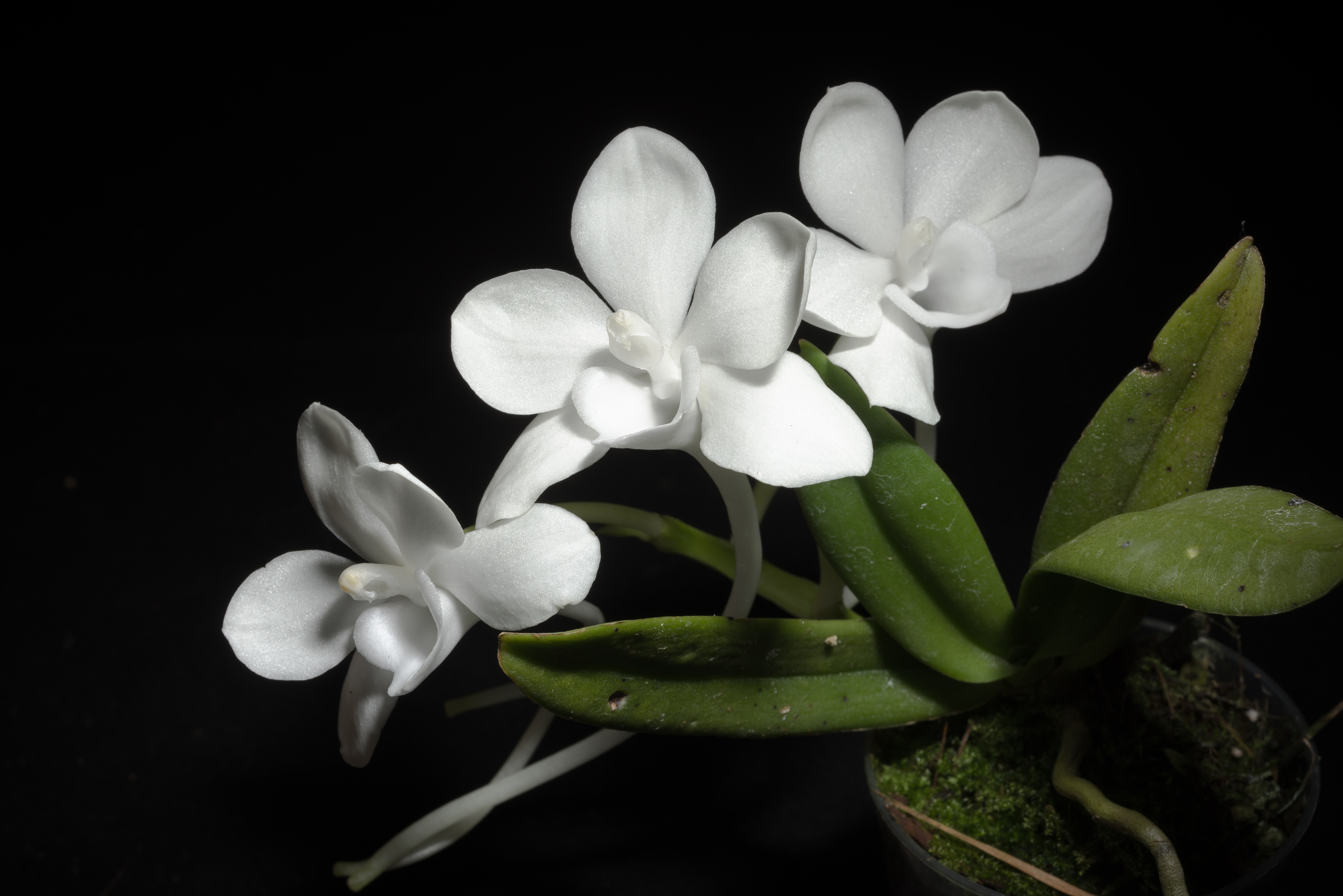
- Amesiella monticola

Scientific classification
- Kingdom: Plantae
- Clade: Tracheophytes
- Clade: Angiosperms
- Clade: Monocots
- Order: Asparagales
- Family: Orchidaceae
- Subfamily: Epidendroideae
- Tribe: Vandeae
- Subtribe: Aeridinae
- Genus: Amesiella; Schltr. ex Garay

Type species
- Amesiella philippinensis (Ames) Garay
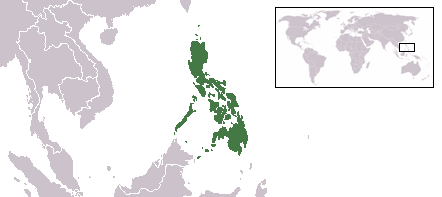
- Distribution of Amesiella

= Amesiella =

Genus of orchids

Amesiella is a genus of orchids endemic to the Island of Luzon, in the Philippines.

== Taxonomy ==
Previously it was believed that the species of this genus belonged to the genus Angraecum within the subtribe Angraecinae. The genus is named for Oakes Ames (1874-1950), founder of the orchid herbarium at Harvard University.

== Description ==
These short-stemmed, miniature epiphytes form elliptic, coriaceous, distichous leaves. White flowers with pronounces spurs, indicating moth pollination, are formed on short, axillary racemes.

overview of species characteristics
photograph	species	spur length	fragrance	colouration	altitude
	A. philippinensis	longer	absent	yellow throat of labellum	lower (400 - 1400 m a.s.l.)
	A. monticola	longest	present	pure white	higher (1800 - 2200 m a.s.l.)
	A. minor	short	absent	vertical yellow stripes on lateral lobes of labellum	intermediate to high (1200 m a.s.l. or 1000-2000 m a.s.l.)

== Species ==
As of May 2014, three species were recognized:

- Amesiella minor Senghas (1999)
- Amesiella monticola Cootes & D.P.Banks (1998)
- Amesiella philippinensis (Ames) Garay (1972)
