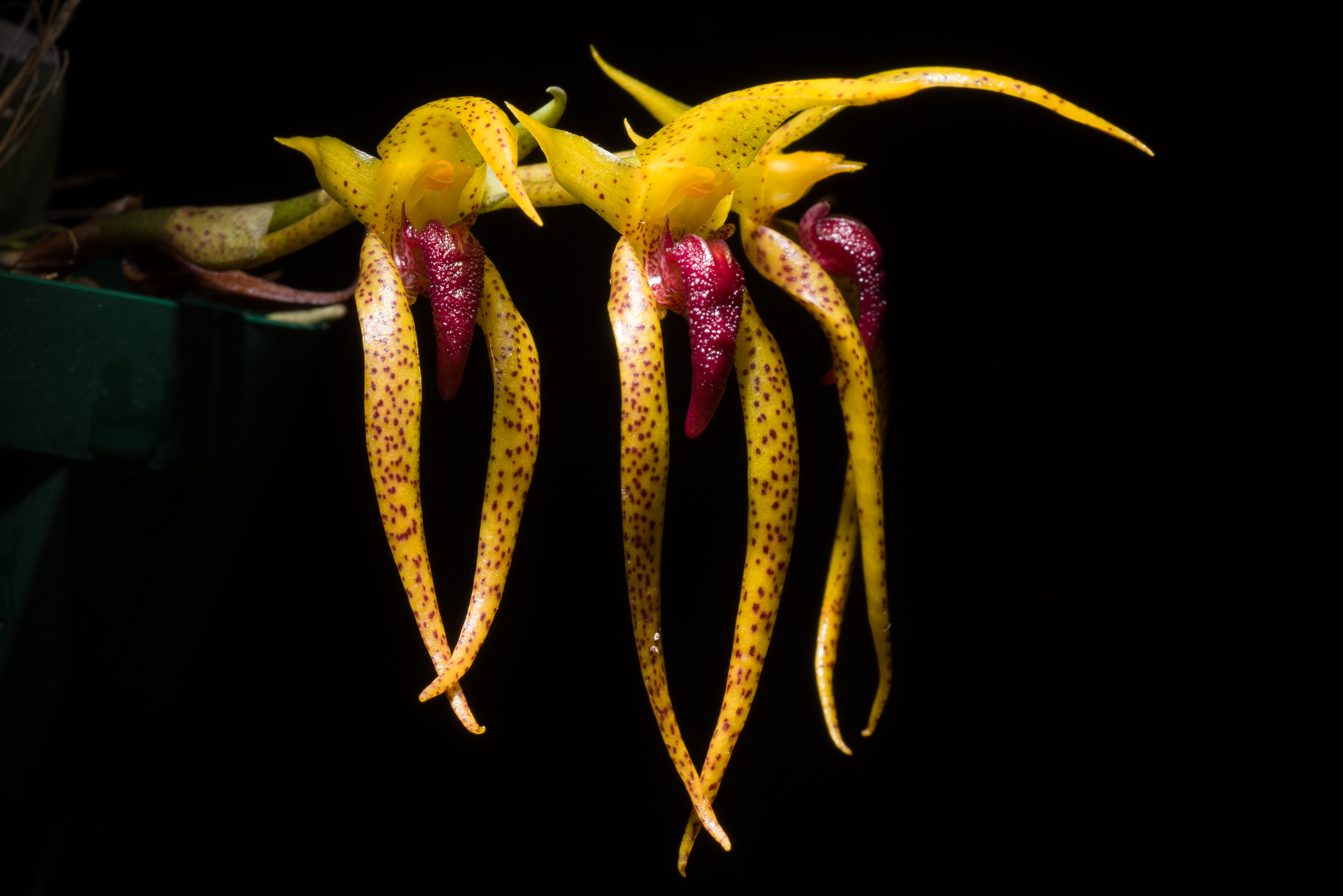

Scientific classification
- Kingdom: Plantae
- Clade: Tracheophytes
- Clade: Angiosperms
- Clade: Monocots
- Order: Asparagales
- Family: Orchidaceae
- Subfamily: Epidendroideae
- Genus: Bulbophyllum
- Species: B. recurvilabre

Binomial name
- Bulbophyllum recurvilabre Garay

= Bulbophyllum recurvilabre =

Species of orchid

Bulbophyllum recurvilabre is a species of flowering plant in the family Orchidaceae.
