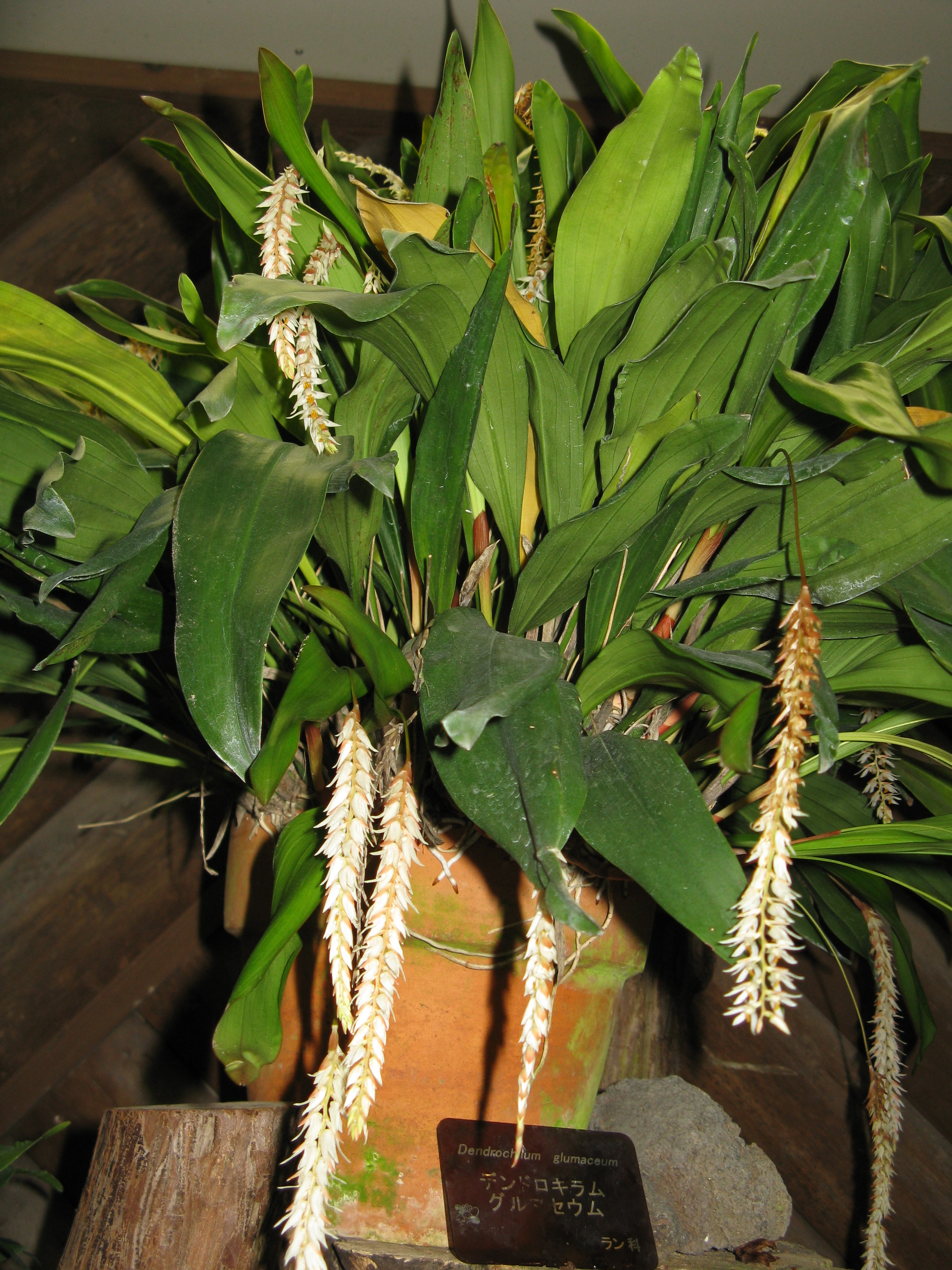

Conservation status
- CITES Appendix II

Scientific classification
- Kingdom: Plantae
- Clade: Tracheophytes
- Clade: Angiosperms
- Clade: Monocots
- Order: Asparagales
- Family: Orchidaceae
- Subfamily: Epidendroideae
- Tribe: Arethuseae
- Genus: Coelogyne
- Species: C. glumacea

Binomial name
- Coelogyne glumacea (Lindl.) M.W.Chase & Schuit.

Synonyms
- Platyclinis glumacea (Lindl.) Benth. ex Hemsl.; Dendrochilum glumaceum (Lindl.); Acoridium glumaceum (Lindl.) Rolfe

= Coelogyne glumacea =

Hay-scented orchid

Species of orchid

Coelogyne glumacea, the hay-scented orchid or husk-like dendrochilum was described by John Lindley in 1841. It is native to the Philippines and Borneo at altitudes between 700 and 2,300 m. Formerly, this species was a member of the genus Dendrochilum until being reclassified in 2021.

== Description ==
C. glumacea is an epiphytic orchid that occurs in tropical forests. This species possesses long feathery pendulous spikes containing two rows of pure white flowers, with yellow to orange lips, that emerge on each new growth. The flowers have a fragrance that has been compared to the scent of curry or hay, giving the plant its common name. From each conical to ovoid pseudobulb grows an erect, single, long, oblanceolate leaf.

== Cultivation ==
This species can be grown in pots and prefers intermediate temperatures and moderate to bright light.

There are several cultivars available: 'Broad Leaf', 'OHG', 'Orange and White Ring' and 'Orange Lip'. 'White Ring' and 'White with Orange Lip'.
