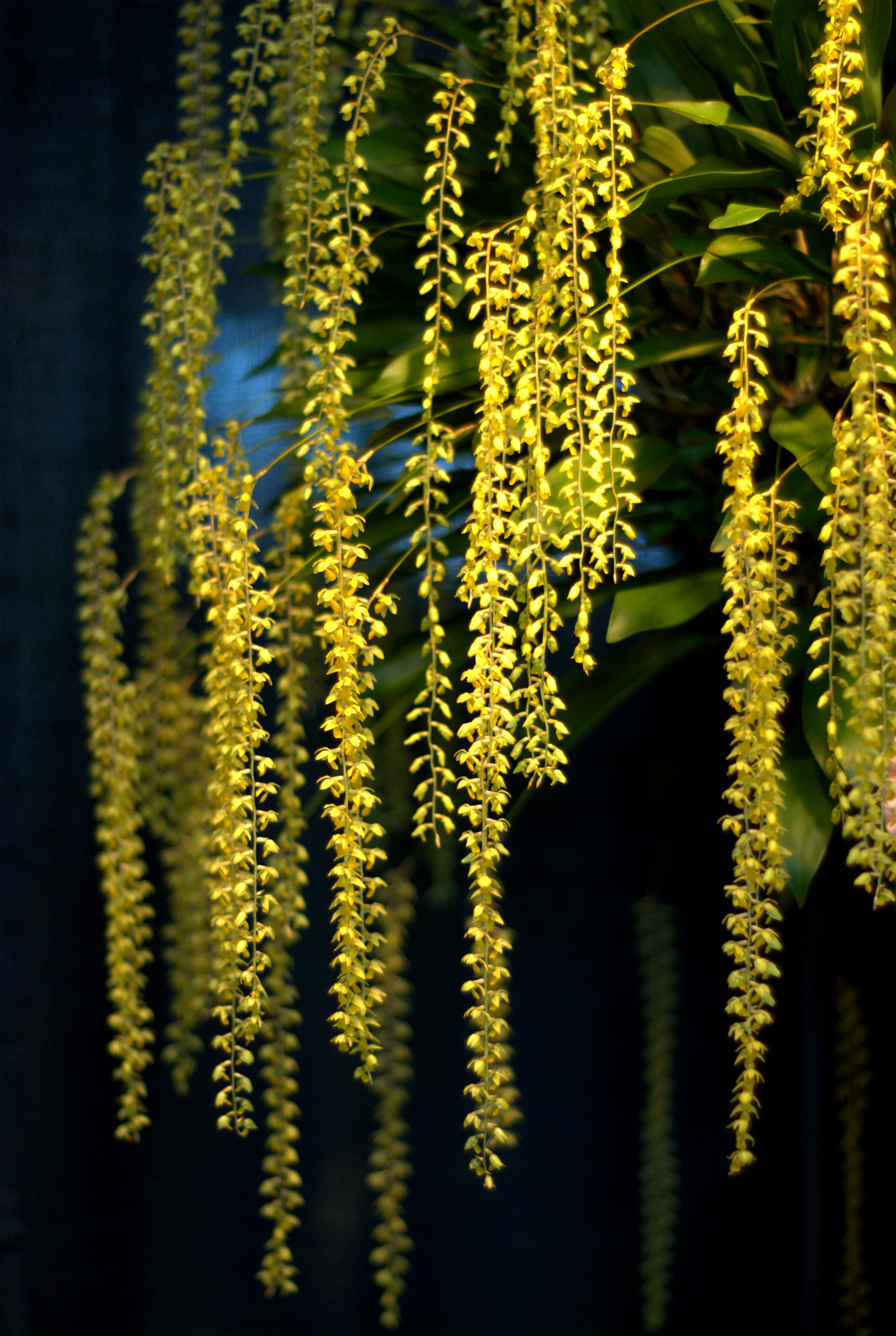

Conservation status
- CITES Appendix II

Scientific classification
- Kingdom: Plantae
- Clade: Tracheophytes
- Clade: Angiosperms
- Clade: Monocots
- Order: Asparagales
- Family: Orchidaceae
- Subfamily: Epidendroideae
- Tribe: Arethuseae
- Genus: Coelogyne
- Species: C. cobbiana

Binomial name
- Coelogyne cobbiana (Rchb.f.) M.W.Chase & Schuit.

Synonyms
- Acoridium cobbianum (Rchb.f.) Rolfe; Dendrochilum cobbianum Rchb.f.; Platyclinis cobbiana (Rchb.f.) Hemsl.; Dendrobium cobbianum Rchb.f.

= Coelogyne cobbiana =

Cobb's dendrochilum

Species of orchid

Coelogyne cobbiana, or Cobb's dendrochilum, described by Heinrich Gustav Reichenbach in 1880, is an epiphytic orchid occurring in the Philippines, growing on moss-covered trees. It can sometimes occur as a lithophyte growing on rocks at altitudes above 1200 m. Formerly, this species was a member of the genus Dendrochilum until being reclassified in 2021.

== Description ==
It possesses white to green-white, creamy flowers with yellow throats that emerge alongside new growth. These flowers have a diameter of 1.8 cm, rather large for this genus. They are fragrant with the scent of new mown hay. When in bloom a multitude of flowers are contained on arching inflorescences, with a length of about 50 cm.

A single lanceolate leaf with prominent midrib sprouts from a conical, yellow pseudobulb.

== Cultivation ==
This species is easy to grow and generally prefers intermediate temperatures and moderate light. It will generally grow very fast, usually doubling in size every year.

== Cultivars ==
There are several cultivars available :

- Coelogyne cobbiana 'Chartreuse Sentinel' (large flowers, sturdy succulent leaves)
- Coelogyne cobbiana 'Fat Leaf' (chartreuse flowers with yellow lip)
- Coelogyne cobbiana 'Gold Chain' (with glittering, golden, fragrant flowers)
- Coelogyne cobbiana 'Green white' (with long spikes of fragrant, green-white flowers)
- Coelogyne cobbiana 'Sentinel 1' (yellow flowers)
- Coelogyne cobbiana 'Sentinel's Poco' (miniature creamy flowers with yellow lip)
- Coelogyne cobbiana 'Yellow Sentinel' (yellow flower with darker yellow lip)
