= Bulbophyllum comptonii =

Scientific classification
- Kingdom: Plantae
- Clade: Tracheophytes
- Clade: Angiosperms
- Clade: Monocots
- Order: Asparagales
- Family: Orchidaceae
- Subfamily: Epidendroideae
- Genus: Bulbophyllum
- Species: B. comptonii

Binomial name
- Bulbophyllum comptonii Rendle (1921)

Species of orchid

Bulbophyllum comptonii is a species of orchid in the genus Bulbophyllum found in New Caledonia. The name of the orchid refers to its bulbous leaf shape. Its conservation status is near threatened.
