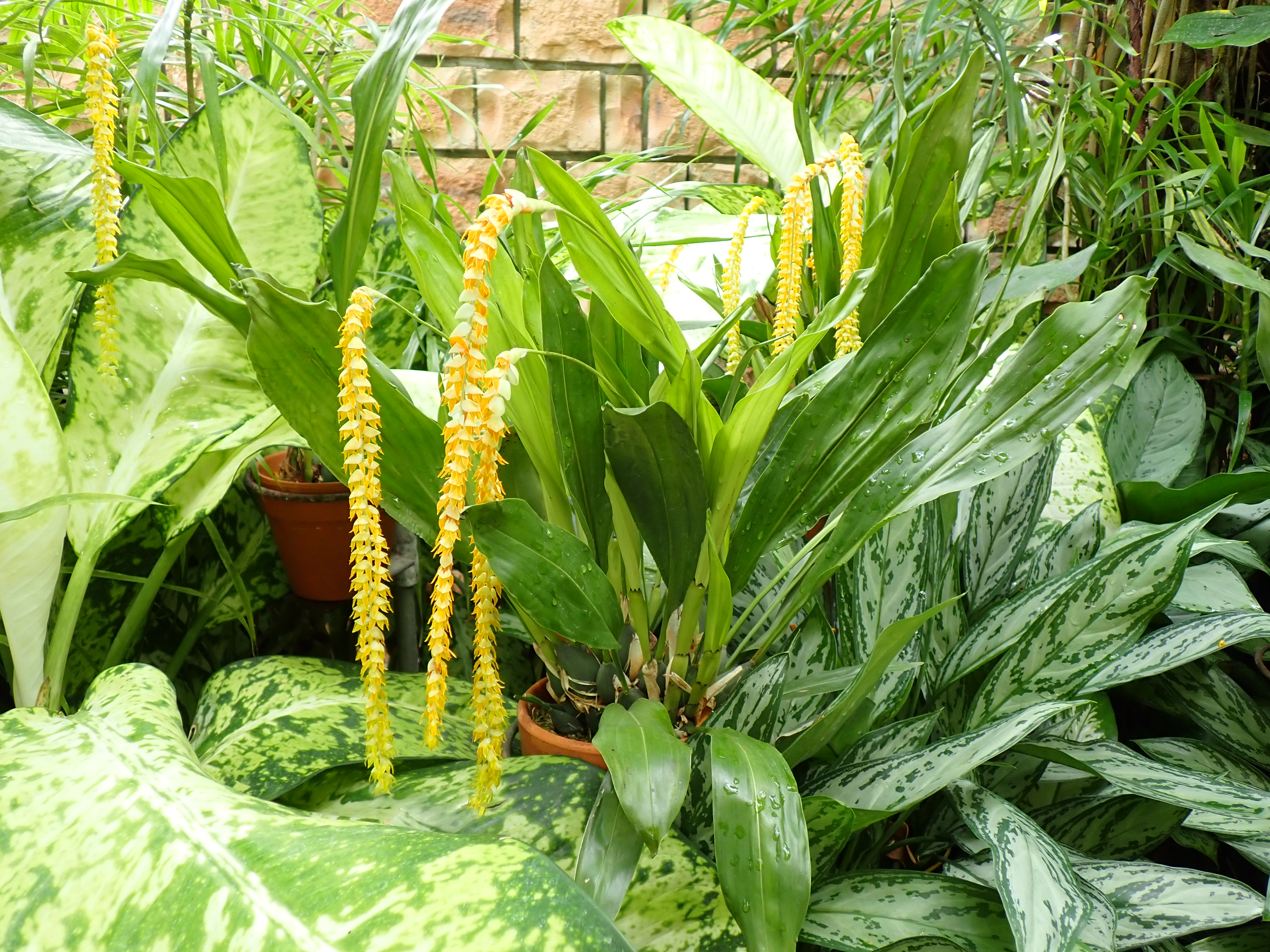

Scientific classification
- Kingdom: Plantae
- Clade: Tracheophytes
- Clade: Angiosperms
- Clade: Monocots
- Order: Asparagales
- Family: Orchidaceae
- Subfamily: Epidendroideae
- Tribe: Arethuseae
- Genus: Coelogyne
- Species: C. magna

Binomial name
- Coelogyne magna (Rchb.f.) M.W.Chase & Schuit.

Synonyms
- Acoridium magnum (Rchb.f.) Rolfe; Dendrochilum magnum (Rchb.f.)

= Coelogyne magna =

Large dendrochilum

Species of orchid

Coelogyne magna is a species of orchid, commonly known as the large dendrochilum, endemic to the Philippines. Formerly, this species was a member of the genus Dendrochilum until being reclassified in 2021.

== Description ==
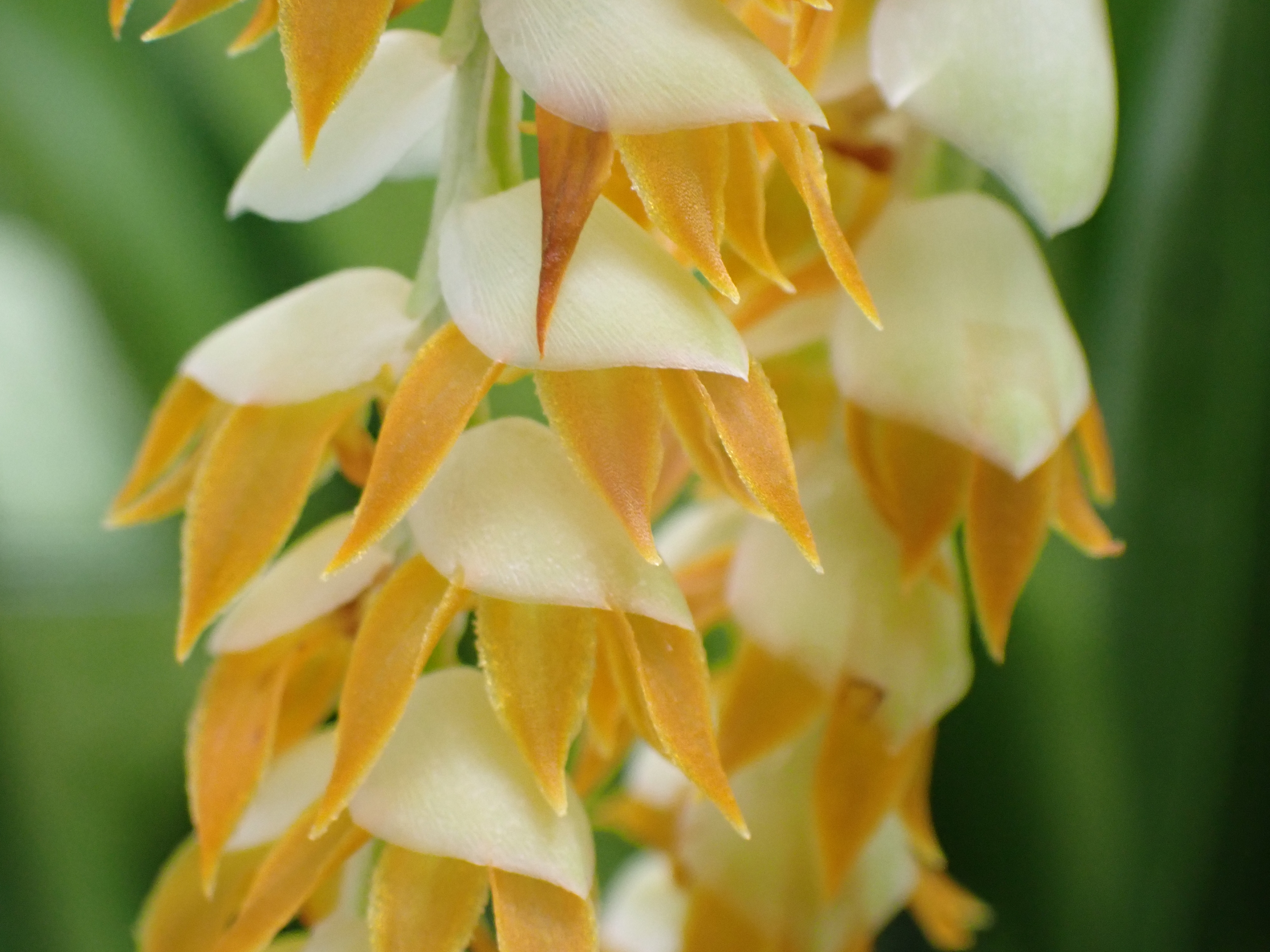
Closeup of C. magna flowers

C. magna is an epiphytic orchid found in tropical forests. The plant blooms on a long inflorescence with yellow and white flowers. The flowers have a strong scent that has been described as sweet and spicy.
