= Bulbophyllum pachyanthum =

Scientific classification
- Kingdom: Plantae
- Clade: Embryophytes
- Clade: Tracheophytes
- Clade: Spermatophytes
- Clade: Angiosperms
- Clade: Monocots
- Order: Asparagales
- Family: Orchidaceae
- Subfamily: Epidendroideae
- Genus: Bulbophyllum
- Species: B. pachyanthum

Binomial name
- Bulbophyllum pachyanthum Schltr.

Species of orchid

Bulbophyllum pachyanthum is a species of orchid in the genus Bulbophyllum. It is native to Samoa, Tonga, Fiji, and New Caledonia
