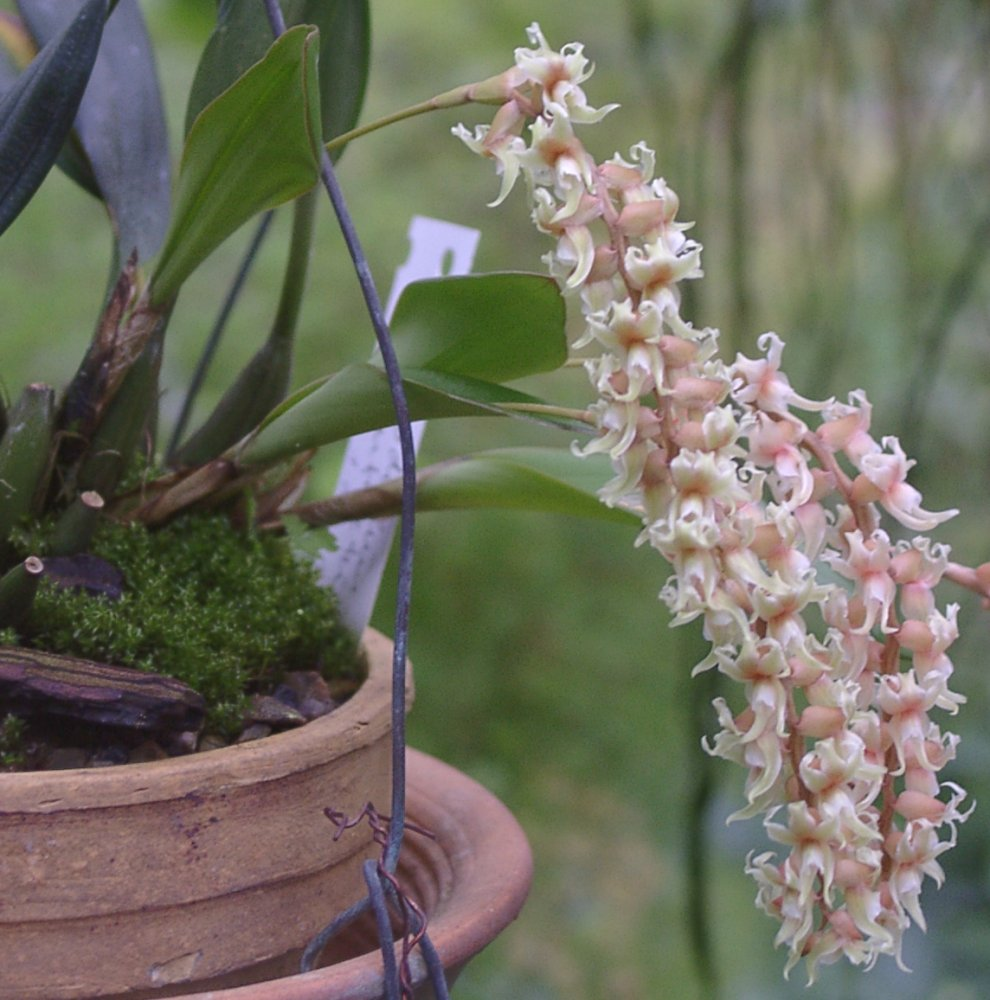

Conservation status
- CITES Appendix II (Note: Listed under the taxonomic synonym Dendrochilum anfractum)

Scientific classification
- Kingdom: Plantae
- Clade: Tracheophytes
- Clade: Angiosperms
- Clade: Monocots
- Order: Asparagales
- Family: Orchidaceae
- Subfamily: Epidendroideae
- Tribe: Arethuseae
- Genus: Coelogyne
- Species: C. anfracta

Binomial name
- Coelogyne anfracta (Ames) M.W.Chase & Schuit.

Synonyms
- Acoridium anfractum Ames; Dendrochilum anfractum (Ames) Pfitzer; Dendrochilum anfractoides Ames; Acoridium anfractoides (Ames) Ames; Dendrochilum anfractum var. anfractoides (Ames) L.O.Williams; Pseudacoridium anfractoides (Ames) Szlach. & Marg.; Pseudacoridium anfractum (Ames) Szlach. & Marg.

= Coelogyne anfracta =

Species of orchid

Coelogyne anfracta is a species of orchid endemic to the Philippines.

== Description ==
C. anfracta is a small epiphyte that blooms on a many flowered inflorescence with flowers that are brown to red.
