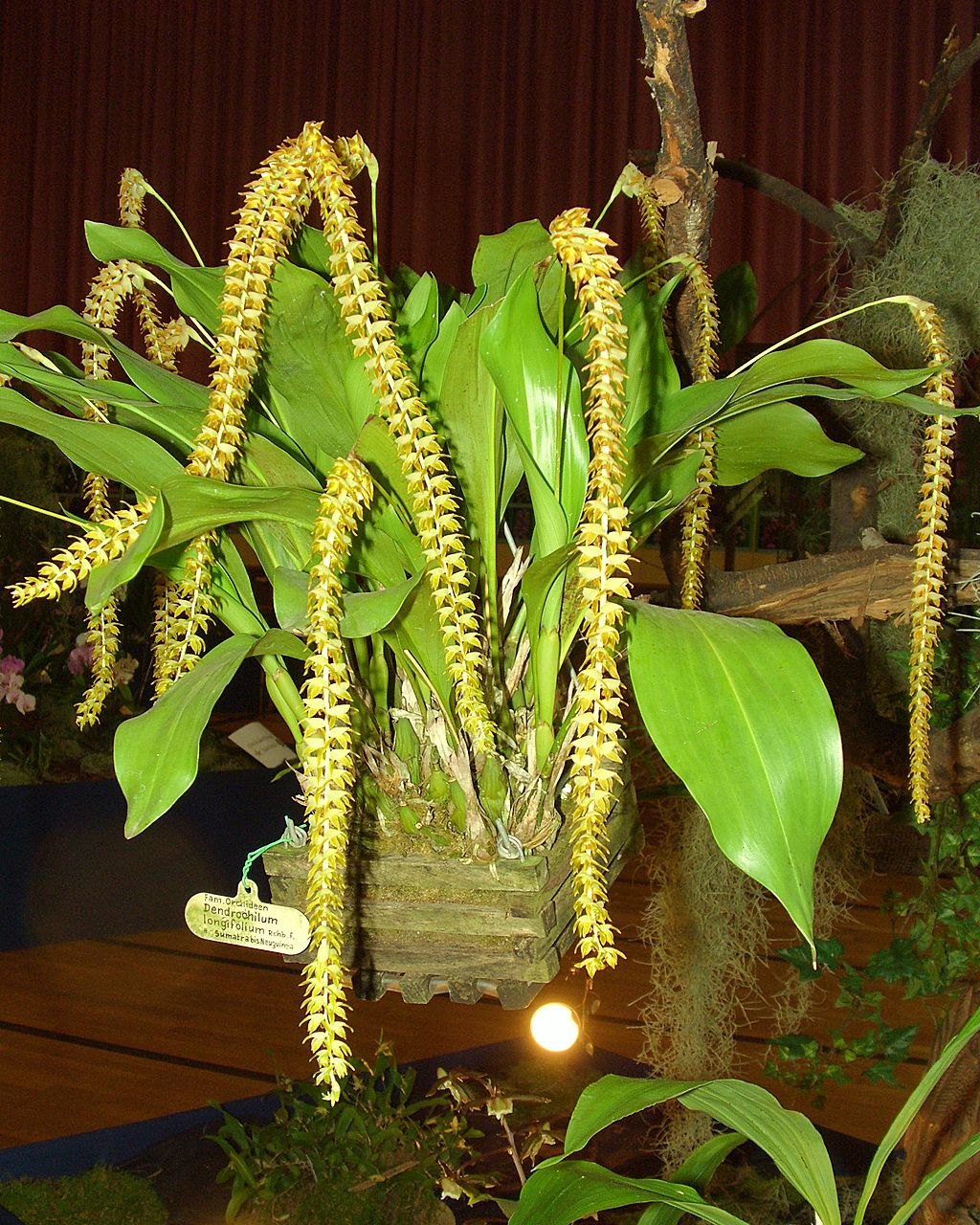

Scientific classification
- Kingdom: Plantae
- Clade: Embryophytes
- Clade: Tracheophytes
- Clade: Angiosperms
- Clade: Monocots
- Order: Asparagales
- Family: Orchidaceae
- Subfamily: Epidendroideae
- Tribe: Arethuseae
- Genus: Coelogyne
- Species: C. bracteosa

Binomial name
- Coelogyne bracteosa Rchb.f.

Synonyms
- Acoridium bracteosum (Rchb.f.) Rolfe; Dendrochilum bracteosum Rchb.f.; Acoridium longifolium (Rchb.f.) Rolfe; Dendrochilum bartonii (Ridl.) Schltr.; Dendrochilum clemensiae Ames; Dendrochilum fuscum Teijsm. & Binn.; Dendrochilum longifolium Rchb.f.; Dendrochilum longifolium var. papuanum J.J.Sm.; Platyclinis bartonii Ridl.; Platyclinis longifolia (Rchb.f.) Hemsl.; Platyclinis longifolia f. papuana (J.J.Sm.) Ridl.

= Coelogyne bracteosa =

Long-leaved dendrochilum

Species of orchid

Coelogyne bracteosa, formerly Dendrochilum longifolium, is a species of orchid, commonly known as the long-leaved dendrochilum. It is found in tropical regions of Myanmar, Borneo, New Guinea, The Philippines, and Thailand.

== Description ==
This species can be found as both a lithophyte and epiphyte throughout its range. C. bracteosa is a medium sized plant that can grow in a variety of temperatures. The plant produces approximately 40 centimeter long sprays with many small yellow green flowers.
