= Coelogyne ignisiflora =

Scientific classification
- Kingdom: Plantae
- Clade: Tracheophytes
- Clade: Angiosperms
- Clade: Monocots
- Order: Asparagales
- Family: Orchidaceae
- Subfamily: Epidendroideae
- Tribe: Arethuseae
- Genus: Coelogyne
- Species: C. ignisiflora

Binomial name
- Coelogyne ignisiflora M.N.Tamayo & R.Bustam.

Synonyms
- Coelogyne ignisiflora (M.N.Tamayo & R.Bustam.) M.W.Chase & Schuit.

Species of orchid

Coelogyne ignisiflora is a species of orchid endemic in Benguet province in the Philippines.

Coelogyne ignisiflora was described in 2020 with the help from researchers from the Philippine Taxonomic Initiative (PTI), The research was led by M.N.Tamayo, Pranada and Rene Alfred Anton Bustamante. It was recorded to be thriving at an elevation of 2,300 meters (7,500 ft) in Mount Komkompol in Benguet. Its flowers, which does not exceed 5 millimetres (0.20 in) in size, are noted for its fiery color. It is proposed to be classified as a vulnerable species under the IUCN Red List.
