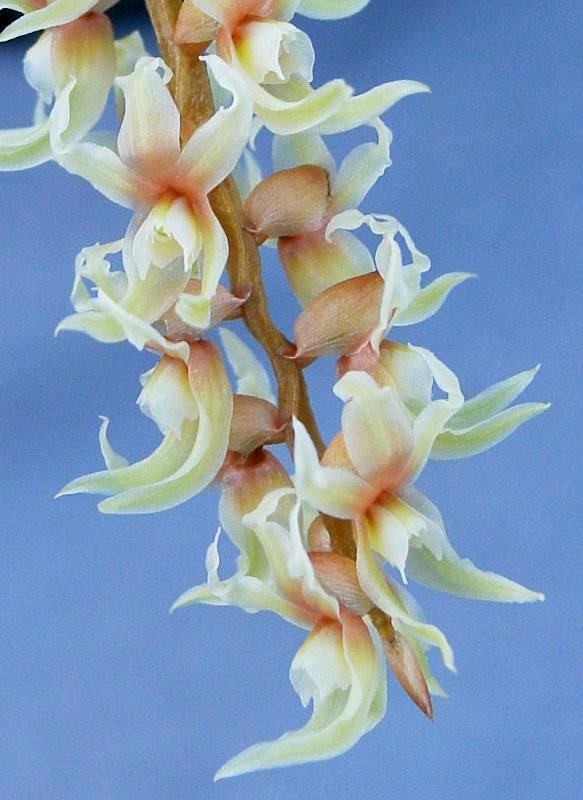

Scientific classification
- Kingdom: Plantae
- Clade: Tracheophytes
- Clade: Angiosperms
- Clade: Monocots
- Order: Asparagales
- Family: Orchidaceae
- Subfamily: Epidendroideae
- Tribe: Arethuseae
- Genus: Coelogyne
- Species: C. cootesii

Binomial name
- Coelogyne cootesii H.A.Pedersen

Synonyms
- Dendrochilum cootesii ((H.A.Pedersen) Szlach. & Marg); Pseudacoridium cootesii ((H.A.Pedersen) Szlach. & Marg)

= Coelogyne cootesii =

Species of orchid

Coelogyne cootesii is an orchid species found only in the Philippines. The species is named after orchid expert Jim Cootes.

== Description ==
This species is an epiphyte that grows in tropical forests. This is a miniature species that blooms with multicolored flowers on an approximately 4 inch long inflorescence.
