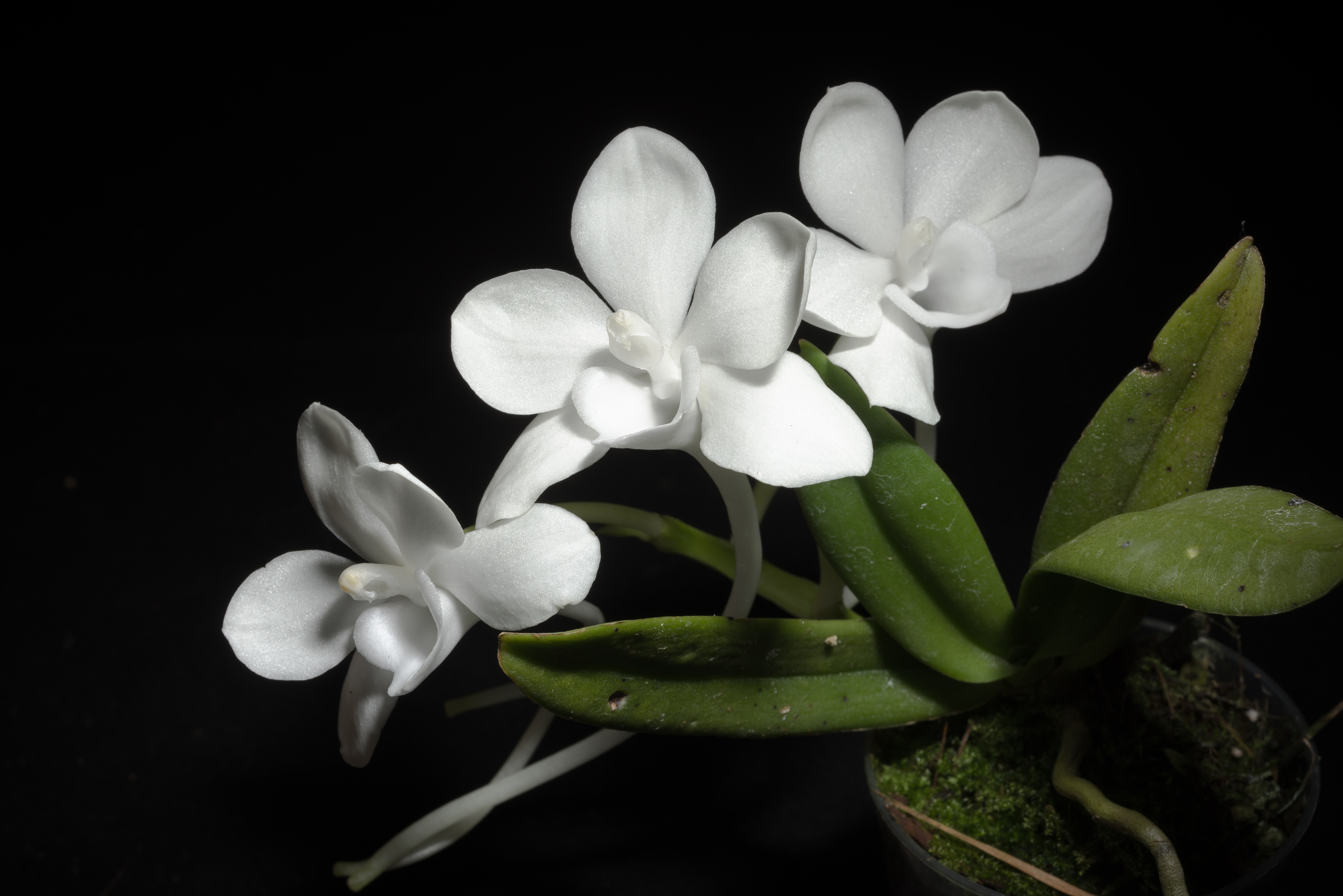
- Flower of Amesiella monticola

Conservation status
- Critically Endangered (IUCN 3.1)

Scientific classification
- Kingdom: Plantae
- Clade: Tracheophytes
- Clade: Angiosperms
- Clade: Monocots
- Order: Asparagales
- Family: Orchidaceae
- Subfamily: Epidendroideae
- Genus: Amesiella
- Species: A. monticola

Binomial name
- Amesiella monticola Cootes & D.P.Banks
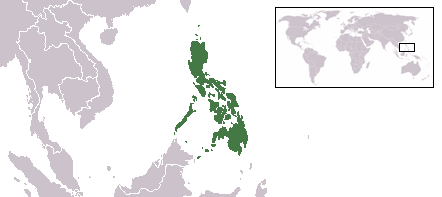
- distribution of Amesiella monticola

Synonyms
- Amesiella philippinensis var. monticola (Cootes & D.P.Banks) R.Rice

= Amesiella monticola =

Species of orchid

Amesiella monticola is a miniature species of epiphytic orchid native to the Philippines. The specific epithet "monticola" refers to the montaneous habitat of the species. Monticola is a combination of "mons" or "montis", meaning mountain and "cola" or "colere" meaning "inhabitant" or "dweller".

== Description ==
These monopodial herbs form small, leathery leaves. The genus Amesiella forms white flowers with long spurs. The 1–6 very large flowers in relation to the vegetative parts of the plants are borne on short, axillary racemes. They have a characteristic long, twisted spur, indicating moth pollination. The flowers are purely white, devoid of any golden pigmentation of the labellum. This separates it from Amesiella philippinensis.

== Taxonomy ==
By some this species is treated as a mere variation of Amesiella philippinensis. Hence, it is synonymous with Amesiella philippinensis var. monticola.

== Conservation ==
This species is critically endangered and its population is decreasing.
