= Bulbophyllum sect. Polymeres =

- Bulbophyllum williamsii

Scientific classification
- Kingdom: Plantae
- Clade: Tracheophytes
- Clade: Angiosperms
- Clade: Monocots
- Order: Asparagales
- Family: Orchidaceae
- Subfamily: Epidendroideae
- Genus: Bulbophyllum
- Section: Bulbophyllum sect. Polymeres (Blume) J.J. Verm. & P. O'Byrne 2008

Type species
- Bulbophyllum tenuifolium

Species
- See text

Synonyms
- Diphyes sect. Polymeres Bl. 1825; Vesicisepalum (J.J.Sm.) Garay, Hamer & Siegerist 1994; Bulbophyllum sect. Elassoglossum Rysy 2007; Bulbophyllum sect. Epibulbon Schltr. 1913; Bulbophyllum sect. Fruticicola Schltr. 1913; Bulbophyllum sect. Leptopus Schltr. 1913; Bulbophyllum sect. Megaloglossum Carr 1933; Bulbophyllum sect. Micromonanthe Schltr. 1913; Bulbophyllum sect. Rhizocaulon Schltr. 1913; Bulbophyllum sect. Vesicisepalum J.J.Sm.

Section of flowering plants

Bulbophyllum sect. Polymeres is a section of the genus Bulbophyllum.

== Description ==
Species in this section have creeping or pendant rhizome and a single flowered inflorescence.

== Distribution ==
Plants from this section are found in Southeast Asia.

== Species ==
Bulbophyllum section Polymeres comprises the following species:

Image	Name	Distribution	Elevation (m)
	Bulbophyllum acutilingue J.J.Sm. 1908	New Guinea	0–400 metres (0–1,312 ft)
	Bulbophyllum aestivale Ames 1915	Philippines	500–600 metres (1,600–2,000 ft)
	Bulbophyllum aundense Ormerod 2005	New Guinea	3,570 metres (11,710 ft)
	Bulbophyllum amauroloma J.J.Verm. & P.O'Byrne 2008	Sulawesi	1,200–1,400 metres (3,900–4,600 ft)
	Bulbophyllum amblyacron Schltr. 1913	New Guinea	700 metres (2,300 ft)
	Bulbophyllum anascaputum Cootes, Cabactulan, Pimentel & M.Leon 2017	The Philippines (Mindanao)	1,600 metres (5,200 ft)
	Bulbophyllum anjae J.J.Verm. & de Vogel 2014	Papua New Guinea	1,700–1,800 metres (5,600–5,900 ft)
	Bulbophyllum apoense Schuit. & de Vogel 2003	the Philippines	2,000 metres (6,600 ft)
	Bulbophyllum appressum Schltr. 1913	New Guinea	
	Bulbophyllum arcuatilabium Aver. 1999	Vietnam	650–750 metres (2,130–2,460 ft)
	Bulbophyllum atrolabium Schltr. 1923	New Guinea	150 metres (490 ft)
	Bulbophyllum atroviride J.J.Verm. 2008	Papua New Guinea	440 metres (1,440 ft)
	Bulbophyllum aureobrunneum Schltr. 1913	New Guinea	1,000–1,100 metres (3,300–3,600 ft)
	Bulbophyllum bakoense J.J.Verm. & A.L.Lamb 2008	Borneo	50 metres (160 ft)
	Bulbophyllum barcelonae Garrino & R. Bustam 2024	Philippines	
	Bulbophyllum betchei F. Muell. 1888	Papua and New Guinea, The Solomon Islands, New Caledonia, Vanuatu, Fiji and Samoa	0–1,000 metres (0–3,281 ft)
	Bulbophyllum bigibbosum J.J.Sm. 1913	New Guinea	1,900 metres (6,200 ft)
	Bulbophyllum bismarckense Schltr. 1905	Papua New Guinea	800 metres (2,600 ft)
	Bulbophyllum bolsteri Ames 1912	Philippines	
	Bulbophyllum bombycinum J.J.Verm. 2008	Papua New Guinea	
	Bulbophyllum boosii J.J.Verm. & Kindler 2015	Philippines	
	Bulbophyllum bowkettiae F.M. Bailey 1884	Australia	600–1,200 metres (2,000–3,900 ft)
	Bulbophyllum caecum J.J.Sm. 1926	Moluccas	
	Bulbophyllum calceolus J.J.Verm. 1991	Borneo	1,200–1,650 metres (3,940–5,410 ft)
	Bulbophyllum capilligerum J.J.Sm. 1927	Java	
	Bulbophyllum caputgnomonis J.J.Verm.1993	New Guinea	440–900 metres (1,440–2,950 ft)
	Bulbophyllum crassinervium J.J.Sm. 1906	Maluku (Ambon)	
	Bulbophyllum catenulatum Kraenzl. 1921	Philippines	1,000–1,800 metres (3,300–5,900 ft)
	Bulbophyllum cerastes J.J.Verm., Schuit. & de Vogel 2020	New Guinea	1,100 metres (3,600 ft)
	Bulbophyllum chaetostroma Schltr. 1913	New Guinea	1,300 metres (4,300 ft)
	Bulbophyllum championii Jenny 2019	New Guinea	
	Bulbophyllum chaunobulbon Schltr. 1913	New Guinea	500–1,300 metres (1,600–4,300 ft)
	Bulbophyllum chrysanthum J.J.Verm. 2008	Papua New Guinea	2,100–2,300 metres (6,900–7,500 ft)
	Bulbophyllum chrysotes Schltr. 1913	New Guinea	250 metres (820 ft)
	Bulbophyllum ciliipetalum Schltr. 1913	New Guinea	1,300 metres (4,300 ft)
	Bulbophyllum cochlioides J.J.Sm. 1929	western New Guinea	200 metres (660 ft)
	Bulbophyllum commissibulbum J.J.Sm. 1929	western New Guinea	1,800 metres (5,900 ft)
	Bulbophyllum compressilabellatum P.Royen 1979	Papua New Guinea	3,355 metres (11,007 ft)
	Bulbophyllum condensatum J.J.Verm. 2008	New Guinea	
	Bulbophyllum crepidiferum J.J.Sm. 1920	Malaysia, Sumatra and Borneo	1,600–1,800 metres (5,200–5,900 ft)
	Bulbophyllum croceodon J.J.Verm. & P.O'Byrne 2008	Sulawesi	1,200–1,400 metres (3,900–4,600 ft)
	Bulbophyllum cubicum Ames 1922	the Philippines	1,400 metres (4,600 ft)
	Bulbophyllum curvicaule Schltr. 1913	New Guinea	400 metres (1,300 ft)
	Bulbophyllum cyclopense J.J. Sm. 1912	Papua and New Guinea and Irian Jaya	
	Bulbophyllum cymbochilum J.J.Verm. & P.O'Byrne 2008	Sulawesi	1,200–1,400 metres (3,900–4,600 ft)
	Bulbophyllum danishii Cavestro 2020	Papua	300–700 metres (980–2,300 ft)
	Bulbophyllum dawongense J.J.Sm. 1934	Papua New Guinea	1,500–2,300 metres (4,900–7,500 ft)
	Bulbophyllum debruynii J.J.Sm. 1929	New Guinea	
	Bulbophyllum dendrobioides J.J.Sm 1913	New Guinea	900 metres (3,000 ft)
	Bulbophyllum densifolium Schltr. 1913	New Guinea	1,300 metres (4,300 ft)
	Bulbophyllum dependens Schltr. 1913	New Guinea	1,200 metres (3,900 ft)
	Bulbophyllum dictyoneuron Schltr.1913	New Guinea	1,300 metres (4,300 ft)
	Bulbophyllum djamuense Schltr. 1913	New Guinea	700 metres (2,300 ft)
	Bulbophyllum dologlossum J.J.Verm., Schuit. & de Vogel 2020	Ppaua New Guinea	2,700–3,100 metres (8,900–10,200 ft)
	Bulbophyllum elassoglossum Siegerist 1991	Philippines	
	Bulbophyllum ellipticum Schltr. 1913	Papua New Guinea	900–1,200 metres (3,000–3,900 ft)
	Bulbophyllum elodeiflorum J.J.Sm. 1912	western New Guinea	400 metres (1,300 ft)
	Bulbophyllum entobaptum J.J.Verm. & P.O'Byrne 2008	Sulawesi	1,200–1,400 metres (3,900–4,600 ft)
	Bulbophyllum entomonopsis J.J.Verm. & P.O'Byrne 1993	Papua New Guinea	0–300 metres (0–984 ft)
	Bulbophyllum epapillosum Schltr. 1913	New Guinea	1,000 metres (3,300 ft)
	Bulbophyllum epibulbon Schltr. 1913	New Guinea and the Solomon Islands	0–1,200 metres (0–3,937 ft)
	Bulbophyllum erioides Schltr. 1905	New Guinea	400 metres (1,300 ft)
	Bulbophyllum erythrosema J.J.Verm. 2008	Papua New Guinea	2,100–2,300 metres (6,900–7,500 ft)
	Bulbophyllum erythrostictum Ormerod 2005	New Guinea	600 metres (2,000 ft)
	Bulbophyllum eutoreton J.J.Verm. 2008	New Guinea	1,200–1,300 metres (3,900–4,300 ft)
	Bulbophyllum exiguiflorum Schltr. 1913	New Guinea	400 metres (1,300 ft)
	Bulbophyllum exilipes Schltr. 1913	New Guinea	1,000 metres (3,300 ft)
	Bulbophyllum falcatocaudatum J.J.Sm. 1914	Papua New Guinea	
	Bulbophyllum farciminiferum J.J.Verm., Schuit. & de Vogel 2020	Papua New Guinea	
	Bulbophyllum fasciculatum Schltr.1913	New Guinea	1,300 metres (4,300 ft)
	Bulbophyllum fenixii Ames 1914	Philippines	
	Bulbophyllum filovagans Carr 1933	Sumatra	1,525 metres (5,003 ft)
	Bulbophyllum fionae J.J.Verm. & P.O'Byrne 2008	Sulawesi	1,000 metres (3,300 ft)
	Bulbophyllum flagellare Schltr. 1913	New Guinea	450–800 metres (1,480–2,620 ft)
	Bulbophyllum folliculiferum J.J.Sm. 1914	New Guinea	850 metres (2,790 ft)
	Bulbophyllum fruticicola Schlechter 1913	New Guinea	700–800 metres (2,300–2,600 ft)
	Bulbophyllum fruticulum J.J.Verm. 2008	New Guinea	2,100–2,300 metres (6,900–7,500 ft)
	Bulbophyllum fusciflorum Schlechter 1913	New Guinea	
	Bulbophyllum futile J.J.Sm. 1908	Papua New Guinea	200–650 metres (660–2,130 ft)
	Bulbophyllum galliaheneum P.Royen 1979	western New Guinea	3,225 metres (10,581 ft)
	Bulbophyllum gamandrum J.J.Verm. & P.O'Byrne 2008	Sulawesi	800–1,000 metres (2,600–3,300 ft)
	Bulbophyllum gilvum J.J.Verm. & A.L.Lamb 1994	Sarawak and Sabah Borneo, Philippines	1,300–1,600 metres (4,300–5,200 ft)
	Bulbophyllum glanduliferum Schltr. 1913	New Guinea	1,000 metres (3,300 ft)
	Bulbophyllum goliathense J.J.Sm. 1911	New Guinea	1,200 metres (3,900 ft)
	Bulbophyllum gramineum Ridl. 1916	western New Guinea	750 metres (2,460 ft)
	Bulbophyllum gymnothema J.J.Verm., Schuit. & de Vogel 2020	Papua New Guinea	2,900 metres (9,500 ft)
	Bulbophyllum habbemense P.Royen 1979	western New Guinea	3,225–3,350 metres (10,581–10,991 ft)
	Bulbophyllum hassallii Kores 1989	Solomon Islands and Fiji	600 metres (2,000 ft)
	Bulbophyllum hellwigianum Kraenzl. 1892	New Guinea	1,700 metres (5,600 ft)
	Bulbophyllum howcroftii Garay 1995	Papua New Guinea	
	Bulbophyllum hydrophilum J.J.Sm. 1905	western Java	1,000–1,200 metres (3,300–3,900 ft)
	Bulbophyllum hystricinum Schltr. 1913	Moluccas and New Guinea	800 metres (2,600 ft)
	Bulbophyllum icteranthum Schltr. 1913	New Guinea	1,100 metres (3,600 ft)
	Bulbophyllum idenburgense J.J.Sm. 1929	Papua New Guinea	400 metres (1,300 ft)
	Bulbophyllum imbricans J.J.Sm. 1912	western New Guinea	400 metres (1,300 ft)
	Bulbophyllum impar Ridl. 1917	Sumatra	1,300–1,400 metres (4,300–4,600 ft)
	Bulbophyllum incommodum Kores 1989	Fiji	
	Bulbophyllum intonsum J.J.Verm. 2008	Papua New Guinea	50 metres (160 ft)
	Bulbophyllum ischnopus Schltr. 1905	New Guinea	
	Bulbophyllum ischyron J.J.Verm., Schuit. & de Vogel 2020	Papua New Guinea	2,500–4,000 metres (8,200–13,100 ft)
	Bulbophyllum japrii Cavestro 2022	Papua	100–400 metres (330–1,310 ft)
	Bulbophyllum johnsonii Hunt 1950	Queensland Australia	600–1,200 metres (2,000–3,900 ft)
	Bulbophyllum josii Verm. & O'Byrne 2011	Sulawesi	
	Bulbophyllum kempfii Schltr. 1921	Papua New Guinea	1,900 metres (6,200 ft)
	Bulbophyllum lamii J.J.Sm. 1929	western New Guinea	10 metres (33 ft)
	Bulbophyllum leptobulbon Verm. 1996	Papua and New Guinea	2,200–2,300 metres (7,200–7,500 ft)
	Bulbophyllum leptocaulon Kraenzl. 1916	Philippines (Luzon)	
	Bulbophyllum leptopus Schltr. 1905	New Guinea and Sulawesi	750–1,300 metres (2,460–4,270 ft)
	Bulbophyllum leve Schltr. 1913	New Guinea	250–300 metres (820–980 ft)
	Bulbophyllum ligulatum W.Kittr. 1984, publ. 1985	New Guinea	
	Bulbophyllum lipochilum J.J.Verm., Schuit. & de Vogel 2020	Papua New Guinea	2,200 metres (7,200 ft)
	Bulbophyllum lonchophyllum Schltr. 1913	New Guinea	400 metres (1,300 ft)
	Bulbophyllum longirostre Schltr. 1913	New Guinea	750–800 metres (2,460–2,620 ft)
	Bulbophyllum luteopurpureum J J Sm. 1907	Sumatra	
	Bulbophyllum luteum J.J.Verm. 2008	Papua New Guinea	
	Bulbophyllum maijenense Schltr. 1913	New Guinea	1,300 metres (4,300 ft)
	Bulbophyllum maquilingense Ames & Quisumb. 1932	Philippines	800–1,000 metres (2,600–3,300 ft)
	Bulbophyllum marginatum Schltr. 1913	New Guinea	150–800 metres (490–2,620 ft)
	Bulbophyllum maxillare [Lindley]Rchb.f 1861	peninsular Malayasia, Sumatra, Java, Borneo, the Sulawesi, New Guinea, the Philippines, the Solomon Islands and Australia (Queensland)	0–800 metres (0–2,625 ft)
	Bulbophyllum melinanthum Schltr. 1905	New Guinea	50–100 metres (160–330 ft)
	Bulbophyllum microbulbon Schltr. 1905	Bismark Archipelago	400 metres (1,300 ft)
	Bulbophyllum microtes Schltr. 1913	New Guinea	250–2,100 metres (820–6,890 ft)
	Bulbophyllum mimiense Schltr. 1913	New Guinea	1,200 metres (3,900 ft)
	Bulbophyllum nannae J.J.Verm., Schuit. & de Vogel 2020	New Guinea	1,300–1,400 metres (4,300–4,600 ft)
	Bulbophyllum nasica Schltr. 1913	Papua and New Guinea	100–750 metres (330–2,460 ft)
	Bulbophyllum nasilabium Schltr. 1921	New Guinea	
	Bulbophyllum nebularum Schltr. 1913	New Guinea	2,500 metres (8,200 ft)
	Bulbophyllum neoguineense J.J.Sm. 1908	Papua New Guinea	
	Bulbophyllum neopommeranicum Schltr. 1905	Bismark Archipelago	300 metres (980 ft)
	Bulbophyllum nudicaule J.J.Verm., Schuit. & de Vogel 2020	Papua New Guinea	
	Bulbophyllum ocellatum Cootes & M.A.Clem. 2011	the Philippines	600 metres (2,000 ft)
	Bulbophyllum odontopelatum Schltr. 1913	New Guinea	1,300 metres (4,300 ft)
	Bulbophyllum oreogenum Schltr. 1913	New Guinea	440–1,000 metres (1,440–3,280 ft)
	Bulbophyllum orthoraphe J.J.Verm. 2020	New Guinea	3,000 metres (9,800 ft)
	Bulbophyllum papuliglossum Schltr. 1913	New Guinea	800 metres (2,600 ft)
	Bulbophyllum pardalotum Garay, Hamer & Siegrist 1995	Philippines	1,500–2,000 metres (4,900–6,600 ft)
	Bulbophyllum paululum Schltr. 1913	New Guinea	1,200 metres (3,900 ft)
	Bulbophyllum pelseri Mansibang & R. Bustam. 2024	Philippines	
	Bulbophyllum perforans J.J.Sm. 1935	Papua New Guinea	1,200 metres (3,900 ft)
	Bulbophyllum perparvulum Schltr. 1915	Borneo (Sarawak)	
	Bulbophyllum pisibulbum J.J.Sm. 1914	Papua New Guinea	2,400 metres (7,900 ft)
	Bulbophyllum plagiopetalum Schltr. 1913	New Guinea	800 metres (2,600 ft)
	Bulbophyllum planiplexum J.J.Verm. 2008	Papua New Guinea	
	Bulbophyllum planitiae J.J.Sm. 1910	New Guinea	150 metres (490 ft)
	Bulbophyllum polyphyllum Schltr. 1913	New Guinea	800 metres (2,600 ft)
	Bulbophyllum pseudotrias J.J.Verm. 1996	Papua New Guinea	1,000–1,300 metres (3,300–4,300 ft)
	Bulbophyllum pulvinatum Schltr. 1913	New Guinea	350–1,200 metres (1,150–3,940 ft)
	Bulbophyllum purpurellum Ridl. 1916	Papua New Guinea	750 metres (2,460 ft)
	Bulbophyllum quadrangulare J.J.Sm. 1911	New Guinea	300–900 metres (980–2,950 ft)
	Bulbophyllum quadrichaete Schltr. 1913	New Guinea	800–1,300 metres (2,600–4,300 ft)
	Bulbophyllum radicans F.M. Bailey 1883	Australia	0–1,000 metres (0–3,281 ft)
	Bulbophyllum radula J.J.Verm., Schuit. & de Vogel 2020	Papua New Guinea	2,400 metres (7,900 ft)
	Bulbophyllum rhodoglossum Schltr. 1913	New Guinea	1,000 metres (3,300 ft)
	Bulbophyllum rhodoneuron Schltr. 1913	New Guinea	2,000 metres (6,600 ft)
	Bulbophyllum rhodophyllum J.J.Verm. & P.O'Byrne 2008	Sulawesi	1,200–1,400 metres (3,900–4,600 ft)
	Bulbophyllum rhynchoglossum Schltr. 1910	Borneo	
	Bulbophyllum rinkei Thoerle & W.A.Phillips 2019	Papua New Guinea	
	Bulbophyllum rubipetalum P.Royen 1979	Papua New Guinea	3,250–3,425 metres (10,663–11,237 ft)
	Bulbophyllum rubrolingue Cootes & R. Boos 2015	the Philippines (Leyte)	600 metres (2,000 ft)
	Bulbophyllum rubromaculatum W.Kittr. 1984 publ. 1985	New Guinea	800 metres (2,600 ft)
	Bulbophyllum ruficaudatum Ridl. 1910	Sarawak	
	Bulbophyllum rugulosum J.J.Sm. 1935	western New Guinea	1,200 metres (3,900 ft)
	Bulbophyllum rutilans J.J.Verm. & A.L.Lamb 2008	Borneo	1,500 metres (4,900 ft)
	Bulbophyllum rysyanum Roeth 2007	Philippines	
	Bulbophyllum sannio J.J.Verm. 2008	New Guinea	920 metres (3,020 ft)
	Bulbophyllum sapphirinum Ames 1915	the Philippines	60 metres (200 ft)
	Bulbophyllum sarcochilum J.J.Verm. & P.O'Byrne 2008	Sulawesi	1,200 metres (3,900 ft)
	Bulbophyllum sawiense J.J.Sm. 1912	New Guinea	100–440 metres (330–1,440 ft)
	Bulbophyllum schistopogon J.J.Verm., Schuit. & de Vogel 2020	Papua New Guinea	2,400 metres (7,900 ft)
	Bulbophyllum semiindutum J.J.Verm. & P.O'Byrne 2008	Sulawesi	1,200–1,400 metres (3,900–4,600 ft)
	Bulbophyllum sphaenopus J.J.Verm. 2008	western New Guinea	600 metres (2,000 ft)
	Bulbophyllum spissum J.J.Verm. 1996	peninsular Malaysia, Sumatra, Borneo and Sulawesi	1,000–1,400 metres (3,300–4,600 ft)
	Bulbophyllum spongiola J.J.Verm. 1996	Papua New Guinea	2,000 metres (6,600 ft)
	Bulbophyllum squamiplectum J.J.Verm., Schuit. & de Vogel 2020	Papua New Guinea	2,800 metres (9,200 ft)
	Bulbophyllum staetophyton J.J.Verm. 2008	Papua New Guinea	1,500–1,600 metres (4,900–5,200 ft)
	Bulbophyllum stagmatoglossum J.J.Verm., Schuit. & de Vogel 2020	Papua New Guinea	2,800–2,900 metres (9,200–9,500 ft)
	Bulbophyllum stylocoryphe J.J.Verm. & P.O'Byrne 2008	Sulawesi	1,200–1,400 metres (3,900–4,600 ft)
	Bulbophyllum subium J.J.Verm., Schuit. & de Vogel 2020	Papua New Guinea	2,500 metres (8,200 ft)
	Bulbophyllum tectipetalum J.J.Sm. 1929	Papua New Guinea	10 metres (33 ft)
	Bulbophyllum teinodragma J.J.Verm., Schuit. & de Vogel 2020	Papua New Guinea	700 metres (2,300 ft)
	Bulbophyllum tenuifolium (Blume) Lindl. 1830	Vietnam, India, Thailand, Malaysia, Sumatra, the Philippines, Borneo and Java	0–1,530 metres (0–5,020 ft)
	Bulbophyllum tricaudatum J.J.Verm. 2008	Papua New Guinea	1,000 metres (3,300 ft)
	Bulbophyllum trichambon Schltr. 1913	New Guinea	300–450 metres (980–1,480 ft)
	Bulbophyllum trivenosum J.J.Verm., Schuit. & de Vogel 2020	Papua New Guinea	1,500 metres (4,900 ft)
	Bulbophyllum tsekourioides M.D. De Leon, Naive et Cootes 2017	Philippines (Mindanao)	2,100 metres (6,900 ft)
	Bulbophyllum tumoriferum Schltr. 1913	Ppaua New Guinea	1,800–2,500 metres (5,900–8,200 ft)
	Bulbophyllum undatilabre J.J.Sm. 1912	New Guinea	75–1,000 metres (246–3,281 ft)
	Bulbophyllum valeryi J J Verm & O'Byrne 2003	Sulawesi	1,000 metres (3,300 ft)
	Bulbophyllum violaceum (Blume) Lindl. 1830	Java and Sumatra	900–1,600 metres (3,000–5,200 ft)
	Bulbophyllum williamsii A.D.Hawkes 1956	Philippines	1,000 metres (3,300 ft)
	Bulbophyllum woelfliae Garay, Senghas & Lemcke 1996	Philippines	1,400–2,000 metres (4,600–6,600 ft)
	Bulbophyllum wolfei B.Gray & D.L.Jones 1991	Australia (Queensland)	900–1,200 metres (3,000–3,900 ft)
	Bulbophyllum xylinopus J J Verm, O'Byrne & Lamb 2015	Sarawak Borneo	
	Bulbophyllum zebrinum J.J.Sm. 1911	Papua New Guinea	
	Bulbophyllum zygochilum J.J.Verm. 2008	Papua New Guinea	450–500 metres (1,480–1,640 ft)
