= Philiris papuanus =

Scientific classification
- Domain: Eukaryota
- Kingdom: Animalia
- Phylum: Arthropoda
- Class: Insecta
- Order: Lepidoptera
- Family: Lycaenidae
- Genus: Philiris
- Species: P. papuanus

Binomial name
- Philiris papuanus Wind et Clench, 1947

Species of butterfly

Philiris papuanus is a species of butterfly of the family Lycaenidae. It is found in Cape York Peninsula, Australia and New Guinea.

The species belongs to the diana species-group, relatively large butterflies within the genus Philiris. Like in other six members of the group, the hindwing underside of P. papuanus is lacking a black spot on the inner margin, and the male genitalia have long and asymmetric valvae.

== Taxonomic History ==
Wind and Clench originally described a subspecies Philiris diana papuanus, suggesting that it may be a species. Only in 2015, Sands upgraded the status and divided P. papuanus into two subspecies. In 2023, the species level difference between P. diana and P. papuanus and subspecific difference within P. papuanus were confirmed by the study of the genitalia.

== Classification ==
Philiris papuanus consists of two subspecies:

- Philiris papuanus papuanus Wind et Clench, 1947
- Philiris papuanus kerri Sands, 2015

== Distribution ==
The nominotypical subspecies P. p. papuanus is found on the mainland New Guinea. Philiris p. kerri is the Australian subspecies from Cape York Peninsula of northern Queensland, where it is recorded from the cape's very tip near Bamaga to the south near the Rocky River.

== Habitat ==
There is a different bollygum host species for the larvae of each P. papuanus subspecies. The nominotypical subspecies P. p. papuanus feeds on Litsea guppyi, while the Australian P. p. kerri on L. breviumbellata.
