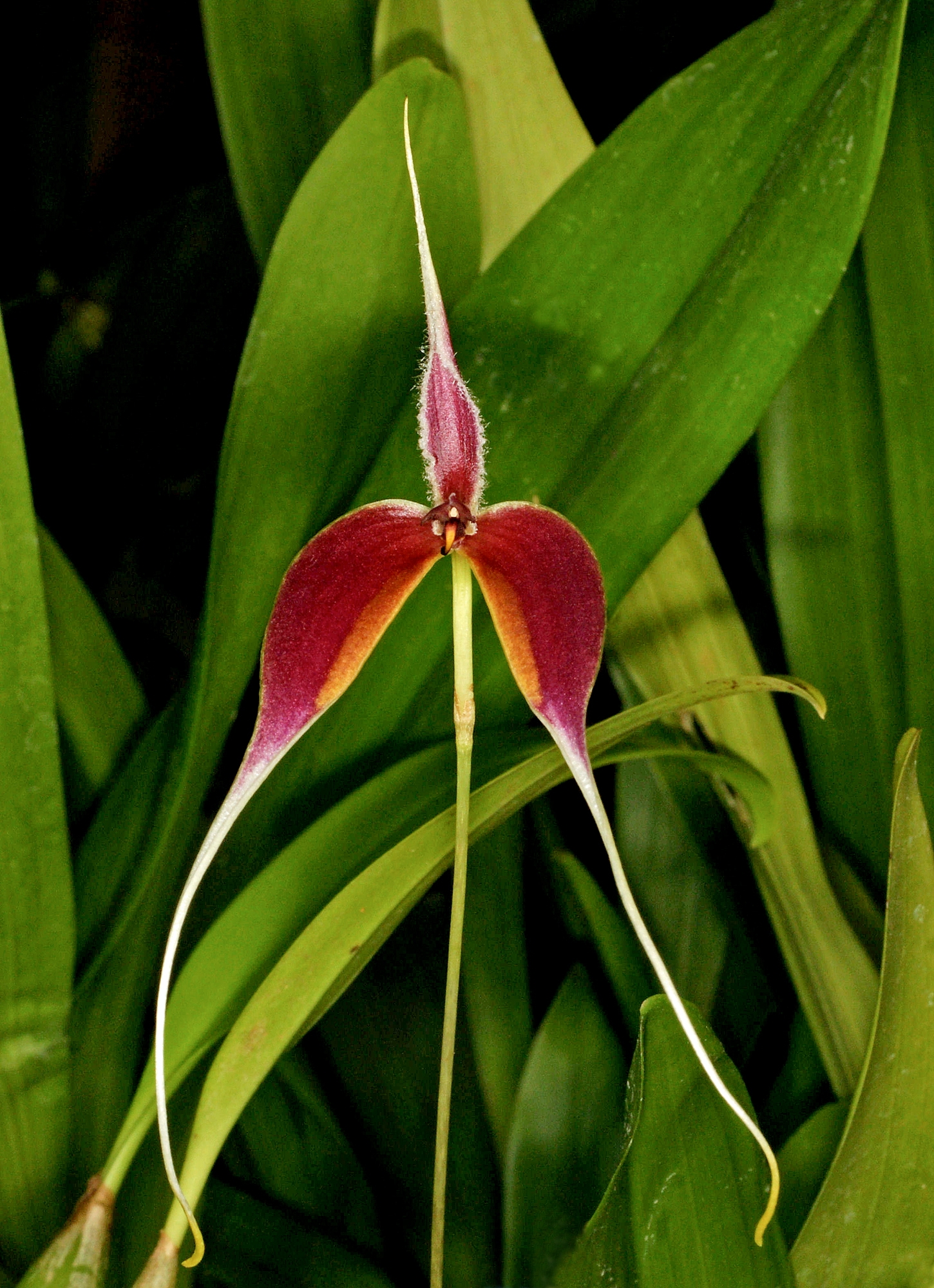
- Bulbophyllum maxillare

Scientific classification
- Kingdom: Plantae
- Clade: Tracheophytes
- Clade: Angiosperms
- Clade: Monocots
- Order: Asparagales
- Family: Orchidaceae
- Subfamily: Epidendroideae
- Genus: Bulbophyllum
- Species: B. maxillare

Binomial name
- Bulbophyllum maxillare (Lindl.) Rchb.f.

Synonyms
- Bolbophyllum maxillare Rchb.f. orth. var.; Bulbophyllum blumei (Kuntze) J.J.Sm.; Bulbophyllum cuspidilingue Rchb.f.; Bulbophyllum masdevalliaceum Kraenzl.; Cirrhopetalum blumei Lindl. nom. illeg., nom. superfl.; Cirrhopetalum blumii Lindl. orth. var.; Cirrhopetalum maxillare Lindl.; Ephippium ciliatum Blume; Ephippium masdevalliaceum (Kraenzl.) M.A.Clem. & D.L.Jones; Phyllorchis blumei Kuntze orth. var.; Phyllorkis blumei Kuntze

= Bulbophyllum maxillare =

Red horntail orchid

Species of orchid

Bulbophyllum maxillare, commonly known as the red horntail orchid, is a species of epiphytic orchid with tapered grooved, dark green to yellowish pseudobulbs, each with a single large, thin leaf and a single reddish flower with yellow or white edges. The lateral sepals are much larger than the dorsal sepal which in turn is much larger than the petals. It grows on the lower branches of rainforest trees in India, New Guinea and tropical North Queensland.

== Description ==
Bulbophyllum maxillare is an epiphytic herb that has a creeping rhizome with tapered dark green to yellowish pseudobulbs 15–40 mm (0.6–2 in) long and 8–12 mm (0.31–0.47 in) wide well spaced along it. Each pseudobulb has a thin but stiff dark green to yellowish, elliptic to lance-shaped leaf 80–150 mm (3–6 in) long and 15–25 mm (0.59–0.98 in) wide with a stalk 10–20 mm (0.4–0.8 in) long. A single flower 60–90 mm (2–4 in) long and 20–25 mm (0.79–0.98 in) is borne on a thin flowering stem 100–200 mm (3.9–7.9 in) long. The flower is reddish to purplish with yellow or white edges. The dorsal sepal is oblong to lance-shaped, 20–35 mm (0.79–1.4 in) long and 3–4 mm (0.12–0.16 in) wide with short, dense hairs on its edges. The lateral sepals are egg-shaped to lance-shaped, 35–80 mm (1.4–3.1 in) long and 5–7 mm (0.20–0.28 in) wide with a thin "tail" a further 20–30 mm (0.79–1.2 in) long. The petals are curved, form a hood over the column, 4–7 mm (0.16–0.28 in) long and about 2 mm (0.079 in) wide. The labellum is purple and yellow, 5–7 mm (0.20–0.28 in) long and about 2 mm (0.08 in) wide with a thin extension on its tip. Flowering occurs between July and October in Australia.

== Taxonomy and naming ==
The red horntail orchid was first formally described in 1843 by John Lindley who gave it the name Cirrhopetalum maxillare and published the description in Edwards's Botanical Register. In 1861 Heinrich Gustav Reichenbach changed the name to Bulbophyllum maxillare.

== Distribution and habitat ==
Bulbophyllum maxillare grows on the lower trunks and branches of rainforest trees on the Andaman and Nicobar Islands, the Malay Peninsula Borneo, Java, the Philippines, Sulawesi, Sumatra, the Solomon Islands, New Guinea and in Australia on Moa Island, Shelburne Bay near Cape Grenville and near the Rocky River.
