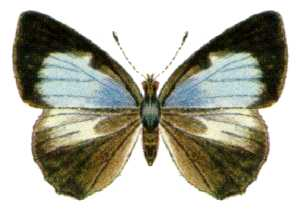

Scientific classification
- Kingdom: Animalia
- Phylum: Arthropoda
- Clade: Pancrustacea
- Class: Insecta
- Order: Lepidoptera
- Family: Lycaenidae
- Genus: Philiris
- Species: P. diana

Binomial name
- Philiris diana Waterhouse et Lyell, 1914

= Philiris diana =

Species of butterfly

Philiris diana is a species of butterflies of the family Lycaenidae from Wet Tropics of northeastern Queensland of Australia, commonly known as large moonbeam. It consists of two subspecies.

The species belongs to the diana species-group, which are relatively large butterflies within the genus Philiris. Like in other six members of the group, the hindwing underside of P. diana does not have a black spot on the inner margin, and the male genitalia possess long and asymmetric valvae. It is most similar to Philiris papuanus, found on Cape York Peninsula of Queensland and New Guinea. The two species have similar genitalia; particularly they share the degree of the valvae asymmetry. The valvae of P. diana, however, differ by the less arched middle section of the left valva, with shorter apical spine; and right valva having short beak-like process, directed dorsolaterally (the process is longer and thinner, with curved apical spine in P. papuanus).

== Taxonomic History ==
In April 1907 F. P. Dodd collected ten males and seven females in Kuranda, Queensland. Waterhouse and Lyell illustrated a male and a female from the series, described a new species Philiris diana in 1914, but did not designate any type specimens.

The original series was deposited in the Australian Museum, Sydney. In 1971 J. V. Peters considered the illustrated male and female as holotype and allotype, respectively.

In 1998 M. J. Parsons designated a lectotype from the series. This was invalid, because the holotype of Peters, though incorrectly established, should be treated as the lectotype, and the rest of the series as paralectotypes (13 specimens). Similarly invalid was a lectotype designation of D. P. A. Sands in 2015.

=== Discovery of subspecies ===
Philiris diana was long known only from the coastal escarpments near Kuranda in Queensland. In April 1972 N Qu, N and K. Tindale caught a female in the rainforest near Lake Tinaroo at the Atherton Tableland (750 m asl) and deposited it in the South Australian Museum, Adelaide. In November 1998 E. D. Edwards and H. Sutrisno caught another female at the Lake Eacham National Park, also at the Atherton Tableland (760 m asl), which was deposited at the Australian National Insect Collection, Canberra. The latter was identified as Philiris diana, though the females of the species were considerably variable in the wing upperside coloration.

Visiting the Atherton Tableland in March 2021, B. S. Hacobian found near Millaa Millaa in the rainforest at 900 m asl a disabled male, which could not fly, but was only walking on the ground near the car. Later in the same year he came across a female, laying eggs on a tree leaves, which was caught and maintained in captivity. A number of specimens have been raised from the eggs of the female. In 2022 he caught more specimens from the area. The same year the butterfly larvae were collected on brown bolly gum near Beatrice by E. Petrie and R. Mayo, and reared to adulthood. Genetically there was a negligible variation within P. diana from different parts of the range. In 2023 the entire collection from Atherton Tableland, including the earlier discovered females from near Lake Tinaroo and Lake Eachem, were described as a new subspecies Philiris diana fortuna. The name fortuna meant luck in the discovery of the first specimens. The holotype was deposited at the Australian National Insect Collection, Canberra.

== Classification ==
Philiris diana is divided into two subspecies:

- Philiris diana diana Waterhouse et Lyell, 1914
- Philiris diana fortuna Hacobian, Braby et Petrie, 2023

=== Philiris diana diana diagnosis ===
Males, upperside: ground color paler violet-blue; costa and apical areas of hindwing broadly white; black terminal band narrower than in P. p. fortuna; forewing with central patch, extending below CuA2; forewing termen weekly arched. Females, upperside: paler than P. p. fortuna; forewing central patch large, 30-40% of wing; hindwing costa and apical areas between Rs and M1 and adjacent central area distal to discocellular veins between M1 and M3 white. Underside less silvery than in P. p. fortuna. Genital valvae narrower than in P. p. fortuna. Early instar dorsal blotches reddish or pinkish. Instar III ground color green or yellow.

=== Philiris diana fortuna diagnosis ===
Males, upperside: ground color from intensive cobalt-blue to purplish-blue; costa and apical areas of hindwing grey; black terminal band broader than in P. p. diana; forewing without white central patch or with occasional grey, greyish-white scales, not extending below CuA2; forewing termen strongly arched. Females, upperside: darker than P. p. diana; forewing central patch small, 20-35% of wing; hindwing costa and apical areas between Rs and M1 and adjacent central area distal to discocellular veins between M1 and M3 reduced, grey, with occasional white scales. Underside silvery-white. Genital valvae broader than in P. p. diana. Early instar dorsal blotches deep red-brown. Instar III ground color green.

== Distribution ==
The nominotypical subspecies P. d. diana is known only from Kuranda near Cairns and Paluma Range, and P. d. fortuna from the Atherton Tableland.

== Habitat ==
Philiris diana diana prefers coastal escarpments at low to mid-elevation forests, while P. d. fortuna lives in montane forest at elevation of 750–1090 m asl. The larva feeds on the brown bolly gum of the laurel family, growing on basalt soil.

== Life History ==
The flight period extends from November till April, with at least two generations. The adults were observed among the sunlit brown bolly gums and other trees nearby in the early-late afternoon. Copulation took place for about 35 min. Females ovipost on abaxial surface of mature leaves, at elevation of about 1 m above the ground. The development from eggs to adults takes about two-three months. Within this period eggs develop for seven to ten days, larva for 51–82 days, and pupa for 10 to 14 days. The larvae develop through six instars. Instar I lives for six or seven days, instar II for six to eight, instar III for seven to nine, instar IV for eight to twelve, instar V for nine to fifteen, and instar VI for 15–31 days.
