= Bulbophyllum lonchophyllum =

Scientific classification
- Kingdom: Plantae
- Clade: Tracheophytes
- Clade: Angiosperms
- Clade: Monocots
- Order: Asparagales
- Family: Orchidaceae
- Subfamily: Epidendroideae
- Genus: Bulbophyllum
- Species: B. lonchophyllum

Binomial name
- Bulbophyllum lonchophyllum Schltr.

Species of orchid

Bulbophyllum lonchophyllum is a species of orchid in the genus Bulbophyllum.
