= Bulbophyllum pulvinatum =

Scientific classification
- Kingdom: Plantae
- Clade: Tracheophytes
- Clade: Angiosperms
- Clade: Monocots
- Order: Asparagales
- Family: Orchidaceae
- Subfamily: Epidendroideae
- Genus: Bulbophyllum
- Species: B. pulvinatum

Binomial name
- Bulbophyllum pulvinatum Schltr.

Species of orchid

Bulbophyllum pulvinatum is a species of Orchidaceae in the genus Bulbophyllum. The orchid's flowers are golden yellow, and it can be found in New Guinea.
