= Bulbophyllum woelfliae =

Conservation status
- Endangered (IUCN 3.1)

Scientific classification
- Kingdom: Plantae
- Clade: Tracheophytes
- Clade: Angiosperms
- Clade: Monocots
- Order: Asparagales
- Family: Orchidaceae
- Subfamily: Epidendroideae
- Genus: Bulbophyllum
- Species: B. woelfliae

Binomial name
- Bulbophyllum woelfliae Garay, Senghas & K.Lemcke

Species of orchid

Bulbophyllum woelfliae is a species of flowering plant in the family Orchidaceae.
