= Bulbophyllum hellwigianum =

Scientific classification
- Kingdom: Plantae
- Clade: Tracheophytes
- Clade: Angiosperms
- Clade: Monocots
- Order: Asparagales
- Family: Orchidaceae
- Subfamily: Epidendroideae
- Genus: Bulbophyllum
- Species: B. hellwigianum

Binomial name
- Bulbophyllum hellwigianum Kraenzl. ex Warb.

Species of orchid

Bulbophyllum hellwigianum is a species of orchid in the genus Bulbophyllum. The species has its native range in Papua New Guinea.
