= Bulbophyllum gramineum =

Scientific classification
- Kingdom: Plantae
- Clade: Tracheophytes
- Clade: Angiosperms
- Clade: Monocots
- Order: Asparagales
- Family: Orchidaceae
- Subfamily: Epidendroideae
- Genus: Bulbophyllum
- Species: B. gramineum

Binomial name
- Bulbophyllum gramineum Ridl.

Species of orchid

Bulbophyllum gramineum is a species of orchid belonging to the genus Bulbophyllum.
