= Bulbophyllum calceolus =

Scientific classification
- Kingdom: Plantae
- Clade: Tracheophytes
- Clade: Angiosperms
- Clade: Monocots
- Order: Asparagales
- Family: Orchidaceae
- Subfamily: Epidendroideae
- Genus: Bulbophyllum
- Species: B. calceolus

Binomial name
- Bulbophyllum calceolus J.J.Verm.

Species of orchid from Borneo

Bulbophyllum calceolus is a species of orchid in the genus Bulbophyllum. It is found in the montane forests of Borneo and typically has a 2.5–5 cm (1–2 inch) yellow flower, a bulb in the middle, and a creeping rhizome between each petal.
