= Bulbophyllum trichambon =

Scientific classification
- Kingdom: Plantae
- Clade: Tracheophytes
- Clade: Angiosperms
- Clade: Monocots
- Order: Asparagales
- Family: Orchidaceae
- Subfamily: Epidendroideae
- Genus: Bulbophyllum
- Species: B. trichambon

Binomial name
- Bulbophyllum trichambon J. J. Sm. 1913

Synonyms
- Bulbophyllum lamelluliferum J.J.Sm. 1913

Species of orchid

Bulbophyllum trichambon is a species of orchid in the genus Bulbophyllum.
