= Bulbophyllum crassinervium =

Scientific classification
- Kingdom: Plantae
- Clade: Tracheophytes
- Clade: Angiosperms
- Clade: Monocots
- Order: Asparagales
- Family: Orchidaceae
- Subfamily: Epidendroideae
- Genus: Bulbophyllum
- Species: B. crassinervium

Binomial name
- Bulbophyllum crassinervium J.J.Sm. 1906

Species of orchid

Bulbophyllum crassinervium is a species of orchid in the genus Bulbophyllum from Ambon, Maluku. The orchid is usually red, though it has been also known to be purple or yellow.
