= Bulbophyllum hystricinum =

Scientific classification
- Kingdom: Plantae
- Clade: Tracheophytes
- Clade: Angiosperms
- Clade: Monocots
- Order: Asparagales
- Family: Orchidaceae
- Subfamily: Epidendroideae
- Genus: Bulbophyllum
- Species: B. hystricinum

Binomial name
- Bulbophyllum hystricinum Schltr.

Synonyms
- Bulbophyllum levidense J.J.Sm. 1929; Bulbophyllum sarcanthiforme Ridl. 1916

Species of orchid

Bulbophyllum hystricinum is a species of orchid in the genus Bulbophyllum.
