= Bulbophyllum zebrinum =

Scientific classification
- Kingdom: Plantae
- Clade: Tracheophytes
- Clade: Angiosperms
- Clade: Monocots
- Order: Asparagales
- Family: Orchidaceae
- Subfamily: Epidendroideae
- Genus: Bulbophyllum
- Species: B. zebrinum

Binomial name
- Bulbophyllum zebrinum J.J.Sm.

Synonyms
- Bulbophyllum ornithoglossum Schltr.

Species of orchid

Bulbophyllum zebrinum is a species of orchid in the genus Bulbophyllum. It can be found in Indonesia.
