= Bulbophyllum apoense =

Scientific classification
- Kingdom: Plantae
- Clade: Tracheophytes
- Clade: Angiosperms
- Clade: Monocots
- Order: Asparagales
- Family: Orchidaceae
- Subfamily: Epidendroideae
- Genus: Bulbophyllum
- Species: B. apoense

Binomial name
- Bulbophyllum apoense Schuit. & de Vogel

Synonyms
- Bulbophyllum graciliscapum Ames & Rolfe 1915

Species of orchid

Bulbophyllum apoense is a species of orchid in the genus Bulbophyllum.
