= Bulbophyllum dependens =

Scientific classification
- Kingdom: Plantae
- Clade: Tracheophytes
- Clade: Angiosperms
- Clade: Monocots
- Order: Asparagales
- Family: Orchidaceae
- Subfamily: Epidendroideae
- Genus: Bulbophyllum
- Species: B. dependens

Binomial name
- Bulbophyllum dependens Schltr.

Species of orchid

Bulbophyllum dependens is a species of orchid in the genus Bulbophyllum. Found in New Guinea in forests on trees at elevations around 1200 meters.
