= Bulbophyllum melinanthum =

Scientific classification
- Kingdom: Plantae
- Clade: Tracheophytes
- Clade: Angiosperms
- Clade: Monocots
- Order: Asparagales
- Family: Orchidaceae
- Subfamily: Epidendroideae
- Genus: Bulbophyllum
- Species: B. melinanthum

Binomial name
- Bulbophyllum melinanthum Schltr.

Species of orchid

Bulbophyllum melinanthum is a species of orchid in the genus Bulbophyllum. Also known as the millet-like bulbophyllum, it can be found in the forests of New Guinea.
