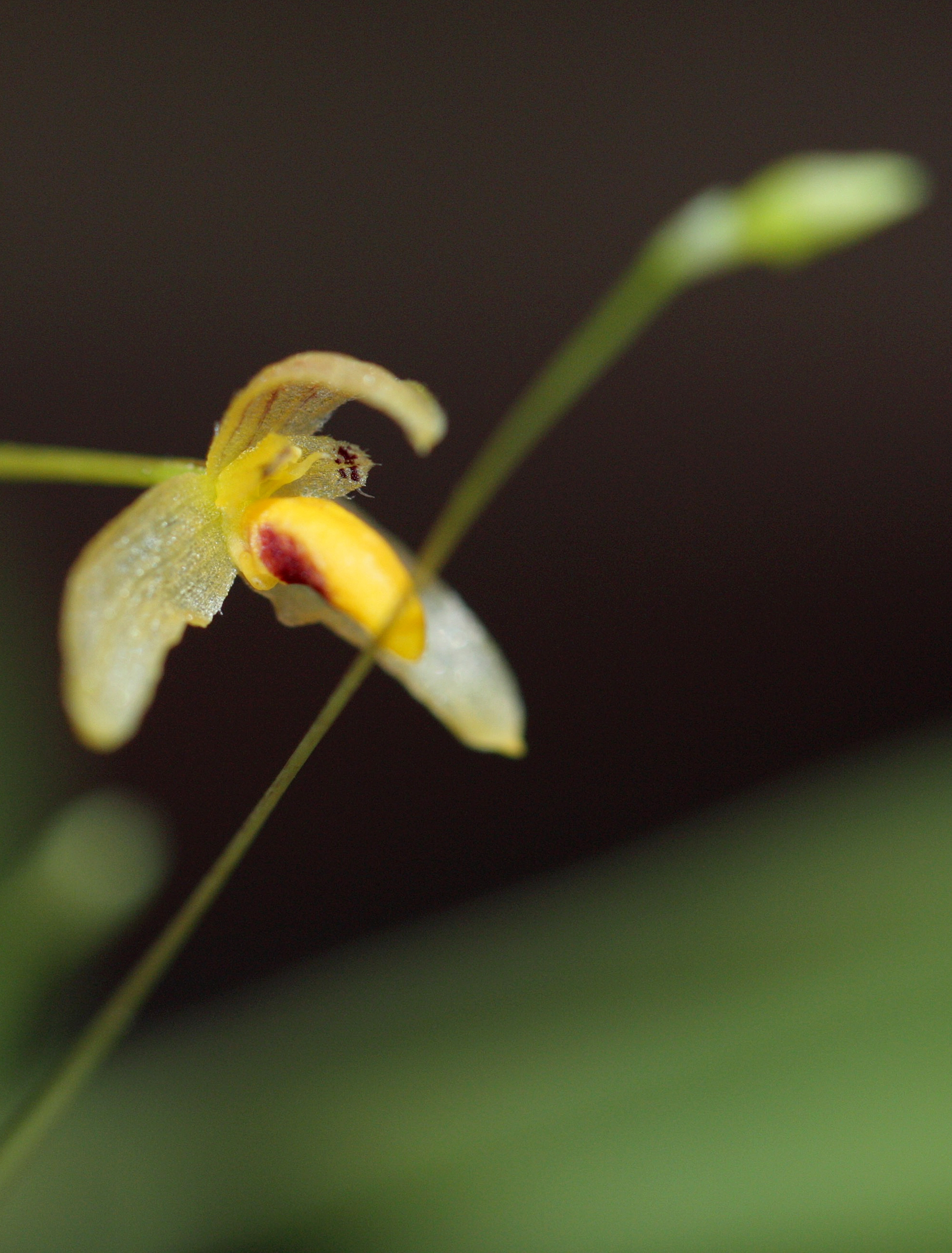

Scientific classification
- Kingdom: Plantae
- Clade: Tracheophytes
- Clade: Angiosperms
- Clade: Monocots
- Order: Asparagales
- Family: Orchidaceae
- Subfamily: Epidendroideae
- Genus: Bulbophyllum
- Species: B. tenuifolium

Binomial name
- Bulbophyllum tenuifolium (Blume) Lindl.

Synonyms
- Diphyes tenuifolia Blume 1825; Phyllorkis tenuifolia (Blume) Kuntze 1891; Bulbophyllum angulatum J.J.Sm. 1908; Bulbophyllum chryseum (Kraenzl.) Ames 1911; Bulbophyllum konstantinovii Aver. 2013; Bulbophyllum microstele Schltr. 1910; Bulbophyllum nigromaculatum Holttum 1947; Cirrhopetalum chryseum Kraenzl. 1910

= Bulbophyllum tenuifolium =

Species of orchid

Bulbophyllum tenuifolium is a species of orchid in the genus Bulbophyllum.
