= Bulbophyllum rhodoglossum =

Scientific classification
- Kingdom: Plantae
- Clade: Tracheophytes
- Clade: Angiosperms
- Clade: Monocots
- Order: Asparagales
- Family: Orchidaceae
- Subfamily: Epidendroideae
- Genus: Bulbophyllum
- Species: B. rhodoglossum

Binomial name
- Bulbophyllum rhodoglossum Schltr. 1913

Species of orchid

Bulbophyllum rhodoglossum is a species of orchid in the genus Bulbophyllum, first described by Rudolf Schlechter in 1913 in Repertorium Specierum Novarum Regni Vegetabilis. It is an epiphyte growing in Papua New Guinea on trees in mountain forests around 1000 metres in elevation. The flowers are white, and the labellum red with a yellow tip.
