= Rocky River (Queensland) =

Stream in north Queensland, Australia

The Rocky River is a stream in north Queensland.
