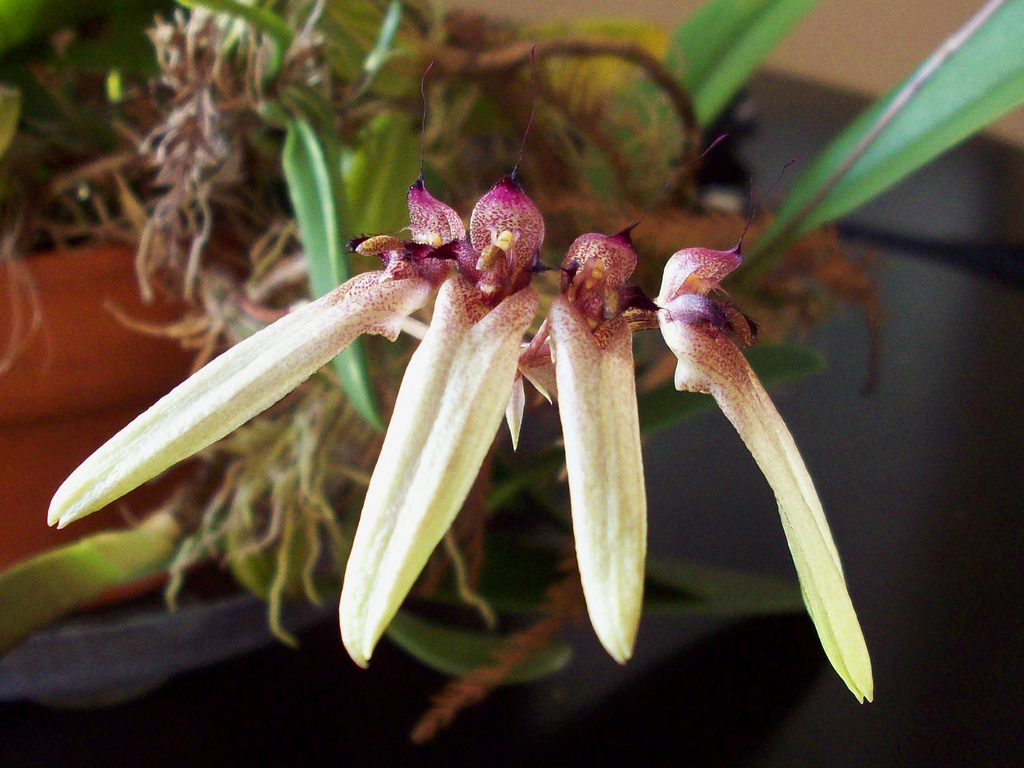
- Bulbophyllum longiflorum

Scientific classification
- Kingdom: Plantae
- Clade: Tracheophytes
- Clade: Angiosperms
- Clade: Monocots
- Order: Asparagales
- Family: Orchidaceae
- Subfamily: Epidendroideae
- Genus: Bulbophyllum
- Section: Bulbophyllum sect. Cirrhopetalum [Lindl.] Rchb.f

Type species
- Bulbophyllum longiflorum

Species
- See text

Synonyms
- Cirrhopetalum Lindl.

= Bulbophyllum sect. Cirrhopetalum =

Section of flowering plants

Bulbophyllum sect. Cirrhopetalum is a section of the genus Bulbophyllum. The taxon name comes from Latin cirrus (fringe) and Greek petalon (petal), hence meaning fringed-petaled.

== Description ==
Plants in this genus are usually small with rhizomes. The dorsal sepal is typically smaller than the lateral sepal. The plants have an umbellate inflorescence and cone-shaped pseudobulbs.

== Distribution ==
Plants from this section are found in Africa and Asia.

== Species ==
Bulbophyllum section Cirrhopetalum comprises the following species:

Image	Name	Distribution	Elevation (m)
	Bulbophyllum amplifolium (Rolfe) N.P.Balakr. & Sud.Chowdhury 1968	China (Guizhou, Xizang and Yunnan), Laos, Myanmar, Thailand	1,700–2,000 metres (5,600–6,600 ft)
	Bulbophyllum andersonii (Hook. f.) J.J. Sm. 1912	Sikkim, India, Myanmar, northern Vietnam, and southern China	500–2,000 metres (1,600–6,600 ft)
	Bulbophyllum annamense (Garay) Sieder & Kiehn 2009	Vietnam	
	Bulbophyllum annandalei Ridl. 1920	Thailand and Malaysia	1,000 metres (3,300 ft)
	Bulbophyllum aureoflavum Karuppusamy & Ravichandran 2013	India (Western Ghats)	1,200 metres (3,900 ft)
	Bulbophyllum blaoense Tich & Diep ex Aver. & Tich 2015	Vietnam	800–900 metres (2,600–3,000 ft)
	Bulbophyllum bootanense Parish & Rchb. f. 1874	Bhutan, India (Assam), and Myanmar	
	Bulbophyllum brevipedunculatum T.C.Hsu & S.W.Chung 2008	Taiwan	1,800–2,100 metres (5,900–6,900 ft)
	Bulbophyllum chinense (Lindl.) Rchb.f. 1861	China (Guangdong)	
	Bulbophyllum chondriophorum (Gagnep.) Seidenf. 1974	China (Sichuan)	1,200 metres (3,900 ft)
	Bulbophyllum claviforme Vuong, Q.T.Truong, V.H.Bui & Cootes 2019	Vietnam	1,000 metres (3,300 ft)
	Bulbophyllum cumingii [Lindl.]Rchb.f 1861	Philippines and Borneo (Sabah)	0–500 metres (0–1,640 ft)
	Bulbophyllum eberhardtii ( Gagnep. ) Seidenf. 1992	Myanmar, Thailand, Vietnam and southern China	1,000–1,500 metres (3,300–4,900 ft)
	Bulbophyllum electrinum Seidenf. 1973 publ. 1974	China (Yunnan)	1,400–1,600 metres (4,600–5,200 ft)
	Bulbophyllum elegans Gardner ex Thwaites 1861	India and Sri Lanka	400–1,900 metres (1,300–6,200 ft)
	Bulbophyllum emarginatum (Finet) J.J.Sm. 1912	Chinese Himalayas, eastern Himalayas, Assam, Myanmar, Thailand and Vietnam	1,700–2,600 metres (5,600–8,500 ft)
	Bulbophyllum fenestratum J.J. Sm. 1907	Thailand, peninsular Malaysia, Sumatra, Java and Borneo	100–1,100 metres (330–3,610 ft)
	Bulbophyllum fimbriatum (Lindl.) Rchb.f. 1861	southwestern India	1,300–1,600 metres (4,300–5,200 ft)
	Bulbophyllum fimbriperianthium W.M.Lin 2006	southern Taiwan	1,300–1,400 metres (4,300–4,600 ft)
	Bulbophyllum fischeri Seidenf. 1974	India	1,500–1,700 metres (4,900–5,600 ft)
	Bulbophyllum flaviflorum (Tang, S.Liu & H.Y.Su) Seidenf. 1973	China, Vietnam, Laos and Thailand	
	Bulbophyllum forrestii Seidenf. 1973 publ.1974	China, Myanmar, Thailand, Laos and India	2,000 metres (6,600 ft)
	Bulbophyllum gongshanense Z.H.Tsi 1981	China (Yunnan)	2,000 metres (6,600 ft)
	Bulbophyllum graveolens J.J. Sm. 1912	New Guinea	100–600 metres (330–1,970 ft)
	Bulbophyllum guniuensis W.Y. Ni & J.W. Shao 2022	China (Anhui)	300–400 metres (980–1,310 ft)
	Bulbophyllum henanense J. L. Lu 1992	China (Henan)	800–1,100 metres (2,600–3,600 ft)
	Bulbophyllum helenae J.J. Sm. 1912	China (Yunnan), Nepal, Sikkim, Myanmar and Thailand	800–2,700 metres (2,600–8,900 ft)
	Bulbophyllum hirundinis [Gagnep.] Seidenf. 1974	Vietnam, Taiwan	500–3,000 metres (1,600–9,800 ft)
	Bulbophyllum huangshanense Y.M. Hu et X.H. Jin 2015	China (Anhui)	400–600 metres (1,300–2,000 ft)
	Bulbophyllum karenkoensis T.P.Lin 2016	Taiwan	200–900 metres (660–2,950 ft)
	Bulbophyllum layae Aver. & Vuong 2019	Vietnam	500–1,500 metres (1,600–4,900 ft)
	Bulbophyllum loherianum [Kranzel] Ames 1925	Philippines	1,000 metres (3,300 ft)
	Bulbophyllum longibrachiatum Z.H.Tsi 1981	China and Vietnam	540–1,600 metres (1,770–5,250 ft)
	Bulbophyllum longiflorum Thouars 1822	Africa, Madagascar, Mascarenes, Seychelles and on into Malaysia, Queensland Australia, New Guinea, New Caledonia, Fiji and the Society Islands and Australia (Queensland)	0–1,700 metres (0–5,577 ft)
	Bulbophyllum metallica Aver. & K.S.Nguyen 2019	Vietnam	1,000–1,200 metres (3,300–3,900 ft)
	Bulbophyllum morotaiense J.J. Sm. 1932	Moluccas	
	Bulbophyllum nanobulbon Seidenfaden 1973 publ. 1974	Malaysia	
	Bulbophyllum nepalense Raskoti & Ale 2013	Nepal	2,300 metres (7,500 ft)
	Bulbophyllum nodosum [Rolfe] J.J.Sm. 1912	India	1,300 metres (4,300 ft)
	Bulbophyllum omerandrum Hayata 1914	China(north Fujian, north Guangdong, Guangxi, western Hubei, north Hunan, Zhejiang) and Taiwan	1,000–2,000 metres (3,300–6,600 ft)
	Bulbophyllum othonis (Kuntze) J.J.Sm. 1912	the Philippines	
	Bulbophyllum papilligerum Aver. 2019	Vietnam	1,000–1,100 metres (3,300–3,600 ft)
	Bulbophyllum paraemarginatum Aver. 2007	Vietnam	1,100 metres (3,600 ft)
	Bulbophyllum pectenveneris (Gagnep.) Seidenf. 1974	China (Hubei, Fujian and Anhui), South Vietnam, Laos and Thailand	800–1,200 metres (2,600–3,900 ft)
	Bulbophyllum picturatum [Lodd.] Rchb.f 1864	Assam to Myanmar, Thailand to Vietnam	900–1,550 metres (2,950–5,090 ft)
	Bulbophyllum pilopetalum M. K. Li, J. P. Deng & Y. Luo 2023	China (Xizang)	2,100 metres (6,900 ft)
	Bulbophyllum pingnanense J.F.Liu, S.R.Lan & Y.C.Liang 2016	China (Fujian)	800–900 metres (2,600–3,000 ft)
	Bulbophyllum pseudopicturatum (Garay) Sieder & Kiehn 2009	Myanmar and Thailand	
	Bulbophyllum pulchrum (N.E. Br.) J.J. Sm. 1912	Maluku, Sumatra, Ambon, Buru and the Moluccas	
	Bulbophyllum purpurascens Teijsm & Binn 1862	Thailand, Myanmar and the islands of Sumatra, Java, and Borneo	900–1,700 metres (3,000–5,600 ft)
	Bulbophyllum rheedei Manilal & C.S.Kumar 1991	India	800 metres (2,600 ft)
	Bulbophyllum romyi B.Thoms 2015	the Philippines	200–400 metres (660–1,310 ft)
	Bulbophyllum rothschildianum (O'Brien) J.J. Sm. 1912	China (Yunnan), northeastern India, Assam and Myanmar	0–300 metres (0–984 ft)
	Bulbophyllum rubroguttatum Seidenf. 1985	Thailand	
	Bulbophyllum sanguineopunctatum Seidenf. & A.D.Kerr 1973 publ. 1974	Thailand and Laos	500 metres (1,600 ft)
	Bulbophyllum sarcophylloides Garay, Hamer & Siegerist 1994	northeastern India and Sikkim	300–500 metres (980–1,640 ft)
	Bulbophyllum sarcophyllum [King & Pntlg.]J.J. Sm. 1912	Bhutan, Assam and Sikkim in the Himalayas well as Myanmar	1,000–2,000 metres (3,300–6,600 ft)
	Bulbophyllum schwarzii Sieder & Kiehn 2010 publ. 2011	Vietnam	
	Bulbophyllum serratotruncatum Seidenf. 1974	Malaysia	
	Bulbophyllum sibuyanense Ames 1912	Philippines	
	Bulbophyllum sikkimense (King & Pantl.) J.J. Sm. 1912	Sikkim	300–500 metres (980–1,640 ft)
	Bulbophyllum skeatianum Ridl. 1915	Malaysia, Laos	1,200–1,750 metres (3,940–5,740 ft)
	Bulbophyllum taeniophyllum Parish & Rchb. f. 1874	China (Yunnan), Myanmar, Thailand, Laos, Malaysia, Sumatra and Java	800–1,000 metres (2,600–3,300 ft)
	Bulbophyllum trigonopus Rchb. f. 1881	Thailand, peninsular Malaysia and Borneo	0–100 metres (0–328 ft)
	Bulbophyllum trongsaense Gyeltshen, Gurung & Kumar, 2020	Bhutan	2,000 metres (6,600 ft)
	Bulbophyllum weberi Ames 1912	Philippines	120–1,500 metres (390–4,920 ft)
	Bulbophyllum yingjiangense B.M.Wang & J.W.Zhai 2017	China	1,400–1,700 metres (4,600–5,600 ft)
	Bulbophyllum yongtaiense J.F. Liu, S.R. Lan & Y.C. Liang 2018	China (Fujian)	343 metres (1,125 ft)
	Bulbophyllum zamboangense Ames 1913	Philippines	20 metres (66 ft)
