= B. chinense =

B. chinense may refer to:

- Bulbophyllum chinense, an orchid species
- Bupleurum chinense, a plant species found in East Asia

== See also ==
- B. chinensis
