= B. graveolens =

B. graveolens may refer to:

- Bulbophyllum graveolens, an orchid species
- Bursera graveolens, the palo santo, a tree species native to Central America and South America
