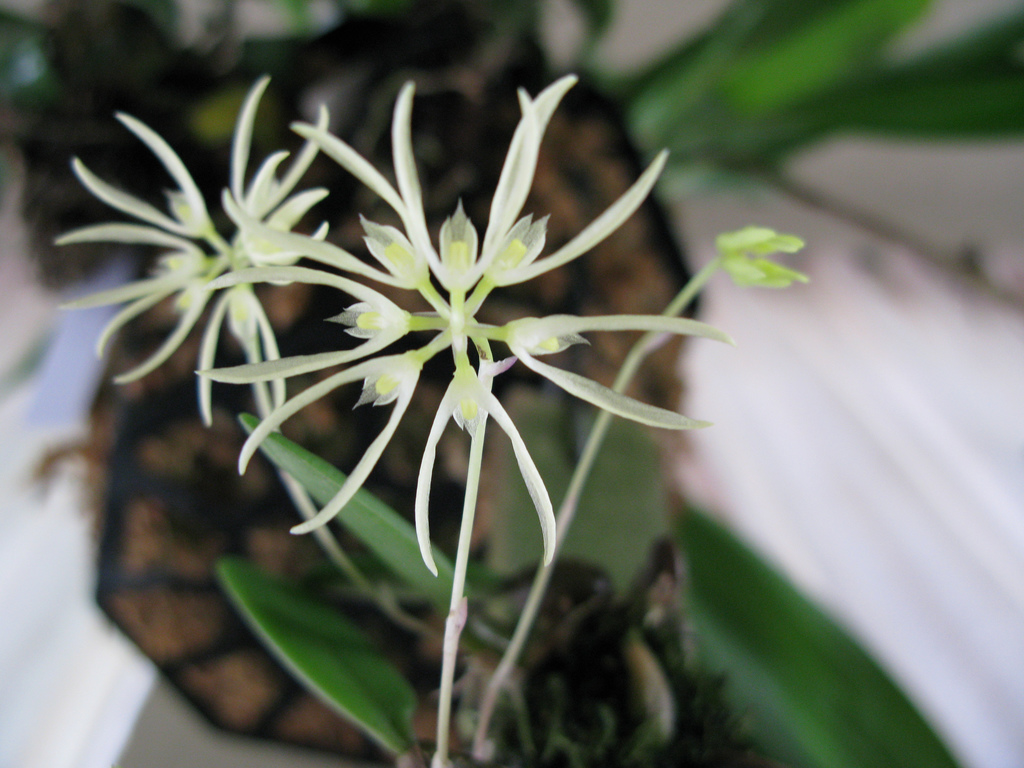

Scientific classification
- Kingdom: Plantae
- Clade: Tracheophytes
- Clade: Angiosperms
- Clade: Monocots
- Order: Asparagales
- Family: Orchidaceae
- Subfamily: Epidendroideae
- Genus: Bulbophyllum
- Species: B. purpurascens

Binomial name
- Bulbophyllum purpurascens Teijsm. & Binn.

= Bulbophyllum purpurascens =

Species of orchid

Bulbophyllum purpurascens is a species of orchid in the genus Bulbophyllum in section Cirrhopetalum. Not the most showy of orchids, this orchid bears 10 to 12 flowers on each of its inflorescences. The flowers are pale yellow and are about 1.5 cm long. It is native to Borneo, Indonesia, Malaysia, and Thailand.
