= Bulbophyllum chondriophorum =

Scientific classification
- Kingdom: Plantae
- Clade: Tracheophytes
- Clade: Angiosperms
- Clade: Monocots
- Order: Asparagales
- Family: Orchidaceae
- Subfamily: Epidendroideae
- Genus: Bulbophyllum
- Species: B. chondriophorum

Binomial name
- Bulbophyllum chondriophorum (Gagnep.) Seidenf.

Species of orchid

Bulbophyllum chondriophorum is a flowering plant in the family Orchidaceae. Within the genus Bulbophyllum it is in section Cirrhopetalum.
