= Bulbophyllum sarcophyllum =

Scientific classification
- Kingdom: Plantae
- Clade: Tracheophytes
- Clade: Angiosperms
- Clade: Monocots
- Order: Asparagales
- Family: Orchidaceae
- Subfamily: Epidendroideae
- Genus: Bulbophyllum
- Species: B. sarcophyllum

Binomial name
- Bulbophyllum sarcophyllum (King & Pantl.) J.J.Sm.

Synonyms
- Cirrhopetalum sarcophyllum King & Pantl.; Bulbophyllum cherrapunjeense Barbhuiya & D.Verma

Species of orchid

Bulbophyllum sarcophyllum is a species of orchid in the family Orchidaceae in section Cirrhopetalum.
