= Bulbophyllum fenestratum =

Scientific classification
- Kingdom: Plantae
- Clade: Tracheophytes
- Clade: Angiosperms
- Clade: Monocots
- Order: Asparagales
- Family: Orchidaceae
- Subfamily: Epidendroideae
- Genus: Bulbophyllum
- Species: B. fenestratum

Binomial name
- Bulbophyllum fenestratum J.J.Sm.

Synonyms
- List: Bulbophyllum cyclosepalon Carr; Bulbophyllum dentiferum Ridl.; Cirrhopetalum cyclosepalon (Carr) Garay, Hamer & Siegerist; Cirrhopetalum dentiferum (Ridl.) Garay, Hamer & Siegerist; Cirrhopetalum fenestratum (J.J.Sm.) Garay, Hamer & Siegerist

Species of orchid

Bulbophyllum fenestratum is a species of orchid in the section Cirrhopetalum that is native to Southeast Asia. The specific epithet fenestratum derives from the Latin fenestra, meaning "window".

== Description ==
Bulbophyllum fenestratum is a small epiphyte with a creeping rhizome giving rise to ovoid to ellipsoid, distinctly four-angled pseudobulbs spaced 2–16 cm apart. Each pseudobulb bears a single apical, erect, obovate to egg-shaped leaf with an obtuse to acute tip and a petiolate base.

The inflorescence is erect to spreading, arising from the base of the pseudobulb on a peduncle 8–12 cm long with a porrect to curved rachis, reaching 9–13 cm in total length. The inflorescence is subumbellate, bearing 7 to 15 flowers arranged in an umbrella-like cluster characteristic of the Cirrhopetalum section. Individual flowers are approximately 1 cm long, white densely punctuated with pink, and borne on pedicels of similar length. The flowers are fragrant and possess a mobile lip, a characteristic feature of the genus Bulbophyllum.

== Taxonomy ==
Bulbophyllum fenestratum was first formally described in 1907 by Johannes Jacobus Smith in the Bulletin du Département de l'Agriculture aux Indes Néerlandaises from specimens collected in Java. The species is placed in Bulbophyllum section Cirrhopetalum, a group characterized by umbellate inflorescences and lateral sepals that are longer than the dorsal sepal.

Several names are now considered synonyms of this species, including Bulbophyllum dentiferum described by Henry Nicholas Ridley in 1915 and Bulbophyllum cyclosepalon described by Cedric Errol Carr in 1932.

== Distribution and habitat ==
Bulbophyllum fenestratum is found in Thailand, Peninsular Malaysia, Sumatra, Java, and Borneo. It grows as an epiphyte in rather open, dry primary forests at elevations between 100 and 1,100 metres.

== Cultivation ==
In cultivation, Bulbophyllum fenestratum is described as an easy-growing species tolerant of a range of temperatures from hot to cool conditions. Like most members of the genus Bulbophyllum, it requires high humidity combined with good air movement and grows best at moderate light levels. The species is considered cold-tolerant relative to other members of its section.
