= Bulbophyllum sarcophylloides =

Scientific classification
- Kingdom: Plantae
- Clade: Tracheophytes
- Clade: Angiosperms
- Clade: Monocots
- Order: Asparagales
- Family: Orchidaceae
- Subfamily: Epidendroideae
- Genus: Bulbophyllum
- Species: B. sarcophylloides

Binomial name
- Bulbophyllum sarcophylloides Garay, Hamer & Siegerist

Synonyms
- Cirrhopetalum sarcophyllum var. minus King & Pantl.

Species of orchid

Bulbophyllum sarcophylloides is a species of flowering plant in the family Orchidaceae. Within the genus Bulbophyllum it is in section Cirrhopetalum.
