= Bulbophyllum forrestii =

Scientific classification
- Kingdom: Plantae
- Clade: Embryophytes
- Clade: Tracheophytes
- Clade: Spermatophytes
- Clade: Angiosperms
- Clade: Monocots
- Order: Asparagales
- Family: Orchidaceae
- Subfamily: Epidendroideae
- Genus: Bulbophyllum
- Species: B. forrestii

Binomial name
- Bulbophyllum forrestii Seidenf.

Species of orchid

Bulbophyllum forrestii is a species of orchid in the genus Bulbophyllum in section Cirrhopetalum. It was named in honour of George Forrest (1873–1932).
