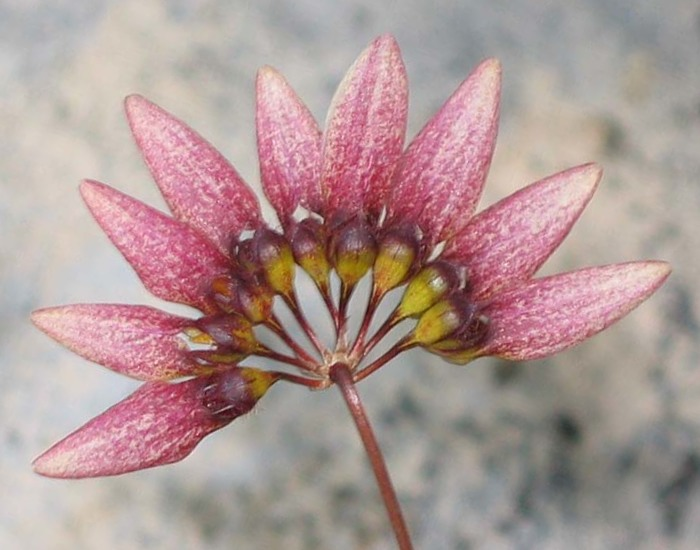

Scientific classification
- Kingdom: Plantae
- Clade: Tracheophytes
- Clade: Angiosperms
- Clade: Monocots
- Order: Asparagales
- Family: Orchidaceae
- Subfamily: Epidendroideae
- Genus: Bulbophyllum
- Species: B. andersonii

Binomial name
- Bulbophyllum andersonii (Hook.f.) J.J.Sm.

= Bulbophyllum andersonii =

Species of orchid

Bulbophyllum andersonii is a species of orchid in the genus Bulbophyllum in section Cirrhopetalum.
