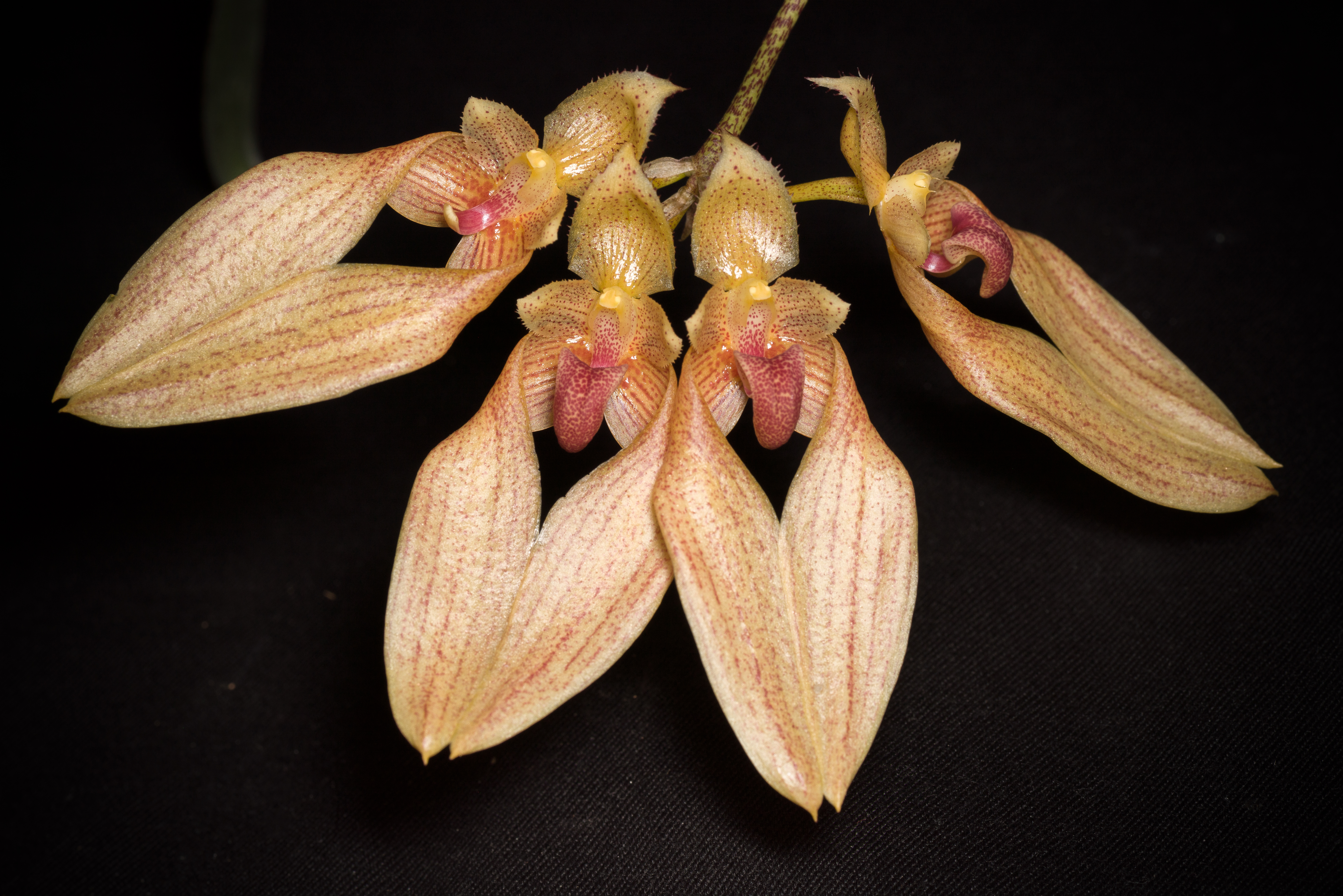
- Bulbophyllum annandalei in bloom

Scientific classification
- Kingdom: Plantae
- Clade: Tracheophytes
- Clade: Angiosperms
- Clade: Monocots
- Order: Asparagales
- Family: Orchidaceae
- Subfamily: Epidendroideae
- Genus: Bulbophyllum
- Species: B. annandalei

Binomial name
- Bulbophyllum annandalei Ridl.

= Bulbophyllum annandalei =

Species of orchid

Bulbophyllum annandalei or Annandale's Bulbophyllum is a species of orchid in the genus Bulbophyllum in section Cirrhopetalum.

It is found in peninsular Thailand and Malaysia at elevations of around 1000 meters above sea level.

== Description ==
Bulbophyllum annandalei has conical pseudobulbs that each carry a single apical succulent leaf.

As with many other species the plant blooms on a flower spike that grows from the base of a pseudobulb. Each flowers spike holds between 2 and 4 small yellow flowers.
