= Bulbophyllum emarginatum =

Scientific classification
- Kingdom: Plantae
- Clade: Tracheophytes
- Clade: Angiosperms
- Clade: Monocots
- Order: Asparagales
- Family: Orchidaceae
- Subfamily: Epidendroideae
- Genus: Bulbophyllum
- Species: B. emarginatum

Binomial name
- Bulbophyllum emarginatum (Finet) J.J.Sm.

Synonyms
- Cirrhopetalum emarginatum Finet; Bulbophyllum brachypodum var. geei A.S.Rao & N.P.Balakr.; Bulbophyllum yoksunense var. geei (A.S.Rao & N.P.Balakr.) Bennet

Species of orchid

Bulbophyllum emarginatum is a species of orchid in the genus Bulbophyllum.
