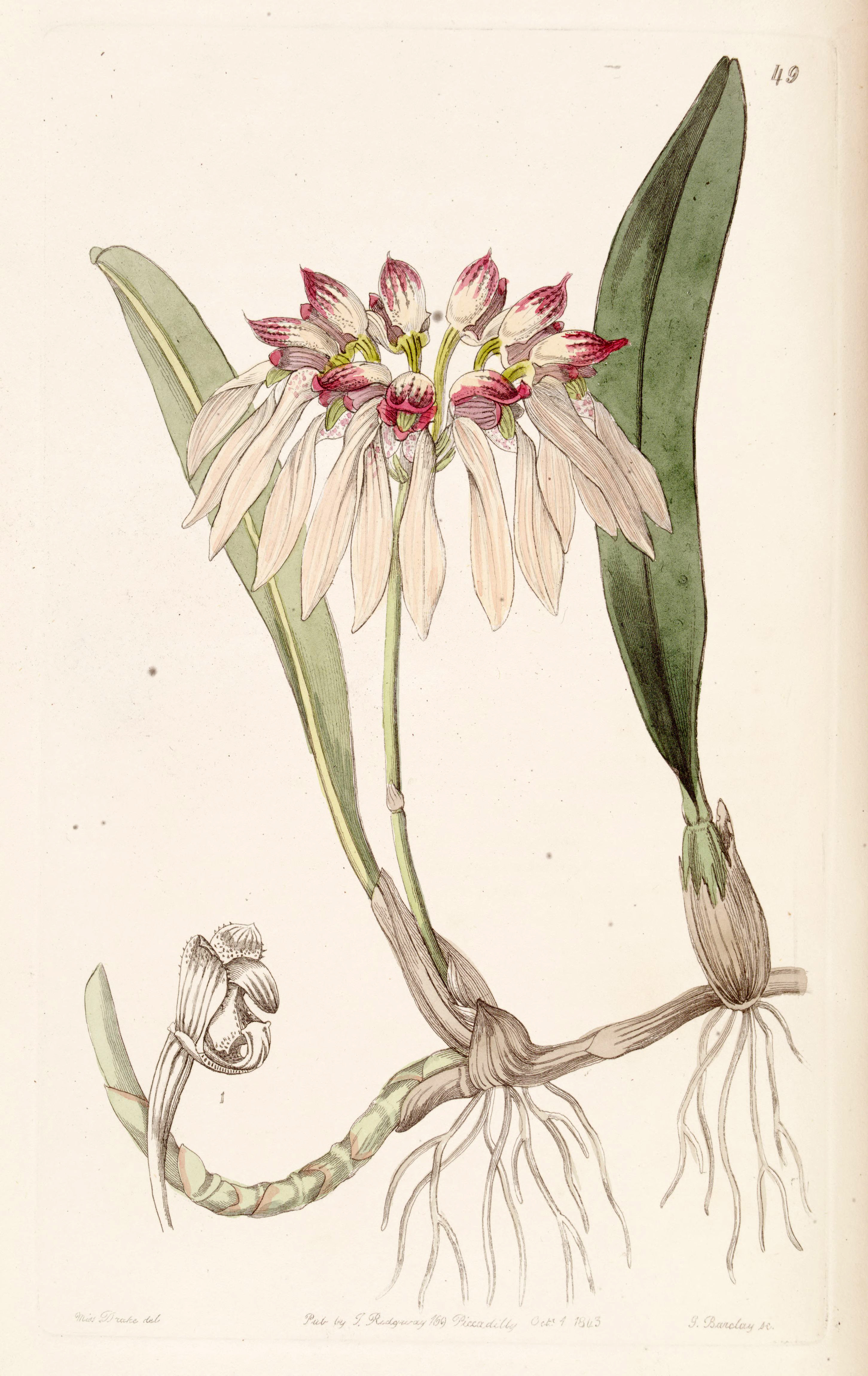

Scientific classification
- Kingdom: Plantae
- Clade: Tracheophytes
- Clade: Angiosperms
- Clade: Monocots
- Order: Asparagales
- Family: Orchidaceae
- Subfamily: Epidendroideae
- Genus: Bulbophyllum
- Species: B. chinense

Binomial name
- Bulbophyllum chinense (Lindl.) Rchb.f. (1861)

Synonyms
- Cirrhopetalum chinense Lindl. (1842) (Basionym); Phyllorkis chinensis (Lindl.) Kuntze (1891)

= Bulbophyllum chinense =

Species of orchid

Bulbophyllum chinense is a species of orchid in section Cirrhopetalum.
