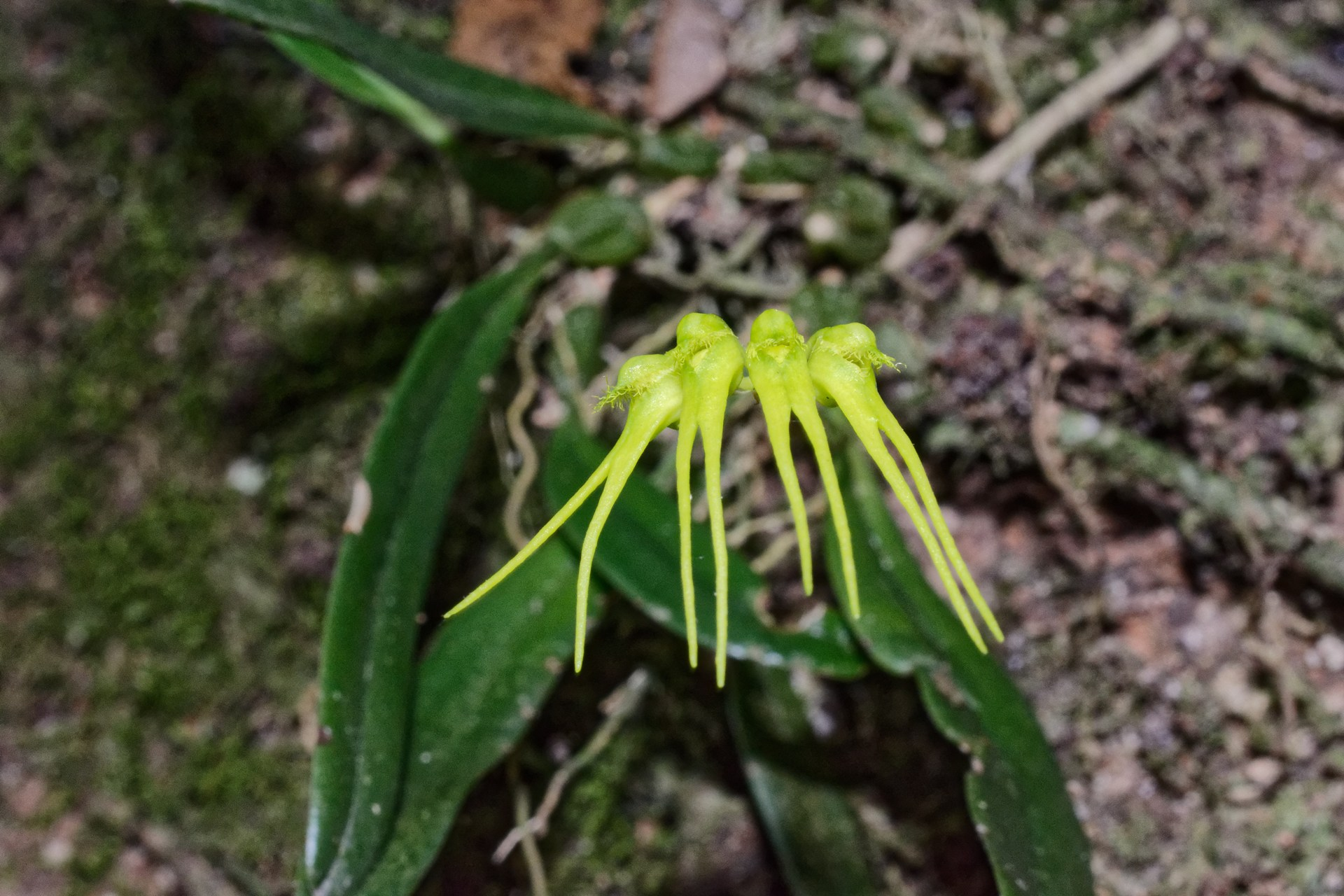

Scientific classification
- Kingdom: Plantae
- Clade: Tracheophytes
- Clade: Angiosperms
- Clade: Monocots
- Order: Asparagales
- Family: Orchidaceae
- Subfamily: Epidendroideae
- Genus: Bulbophyllum
- Species: B. flaviflorum

Binomial name
- Bulbophyllum flaviflorum (Tang, S.Liu & H.Y.Su) Seidenf. (1973)

Synonyms
- Cirrhopetalum flaviflorum Tang, S.Liu & H.Y.Su (1971)

= Bulbophyllum flaviflorum =

Species of orchid

Bulbophyllum flaviflorum is a species of orchid in genus Bulbophyllum. It is a pseudobulbous epiphyte endemic to central and southern Taiwan.
