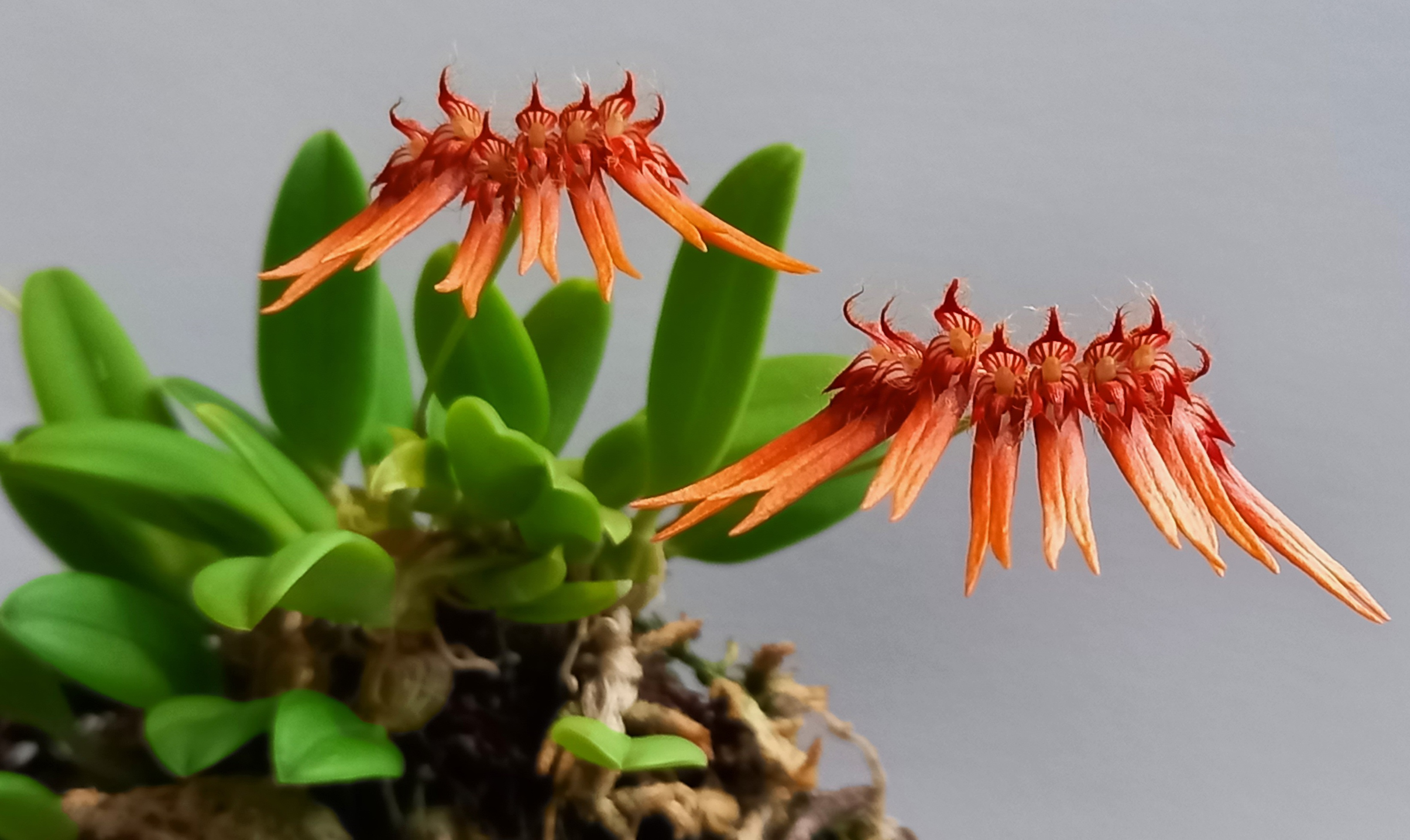

Scientific classification
- Kingdom: Plantae
- Clade: Tracheophytes
- Clade: Angiosperms
- Clade: Monocots
- Order: Asparagales
- Family: Orchidaceae
- Subfamily: Epidendroideae
- Genus: Bulbophyllum
- Species: B. hirundinis

Binomial name
- Bulbophyllum hirundinis (Gagnep.) Seidenf.

Synonyms
- Bulbophyllum electrinum Seidenf. 1973 publ. 1974; Cirrhopetalum aurantiacum W.W.Sm. 1921; Cirrhopetalum melinanthum Schltr. 1919

= Bulbophyllum hirundinis =

Species of orchid

Bulbophyllum hirundinis is a flowering plant in the family Orchidaceae.

== Gallery ==
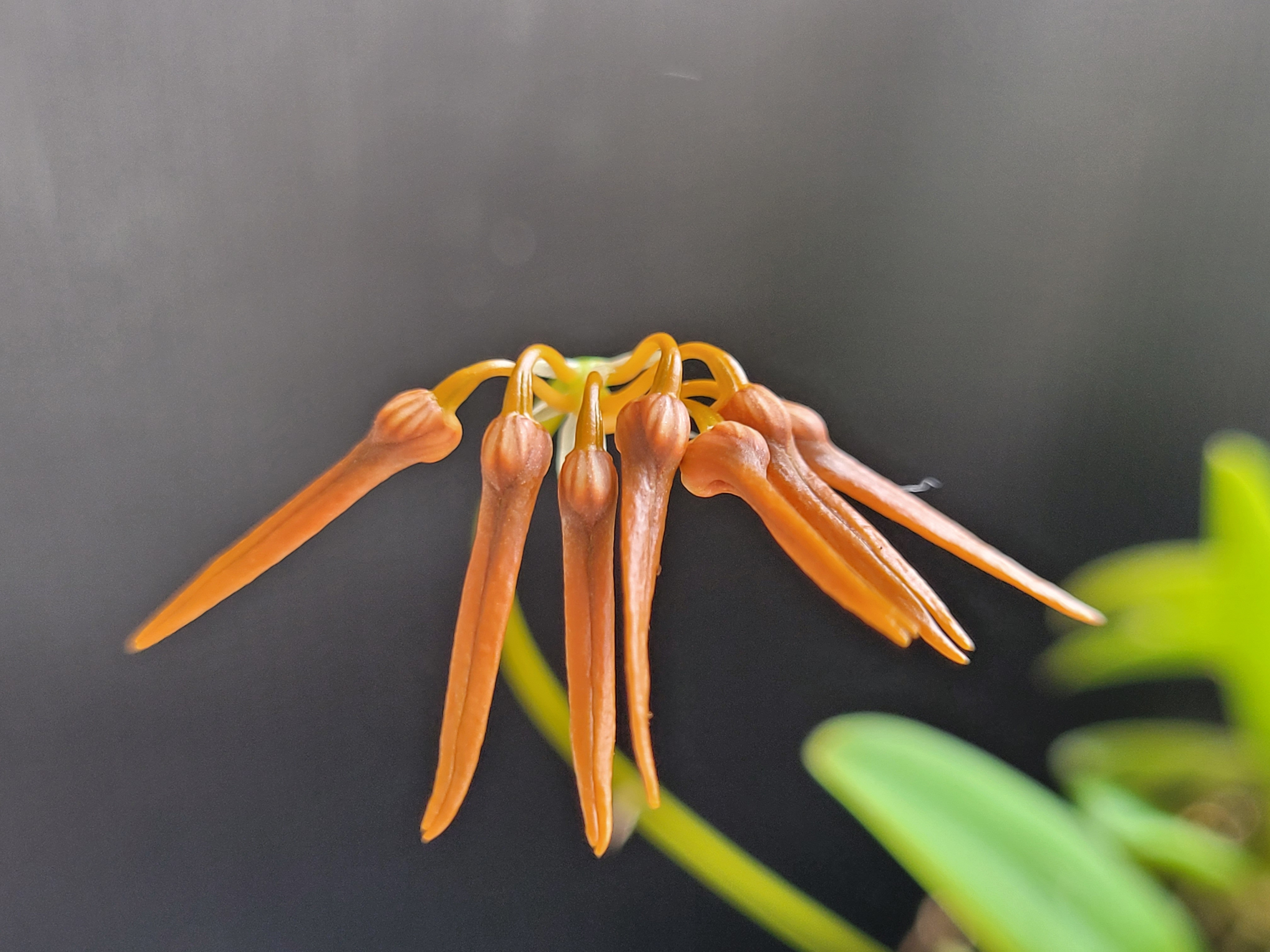
Bulbophyllum hirundinis var. calvum
