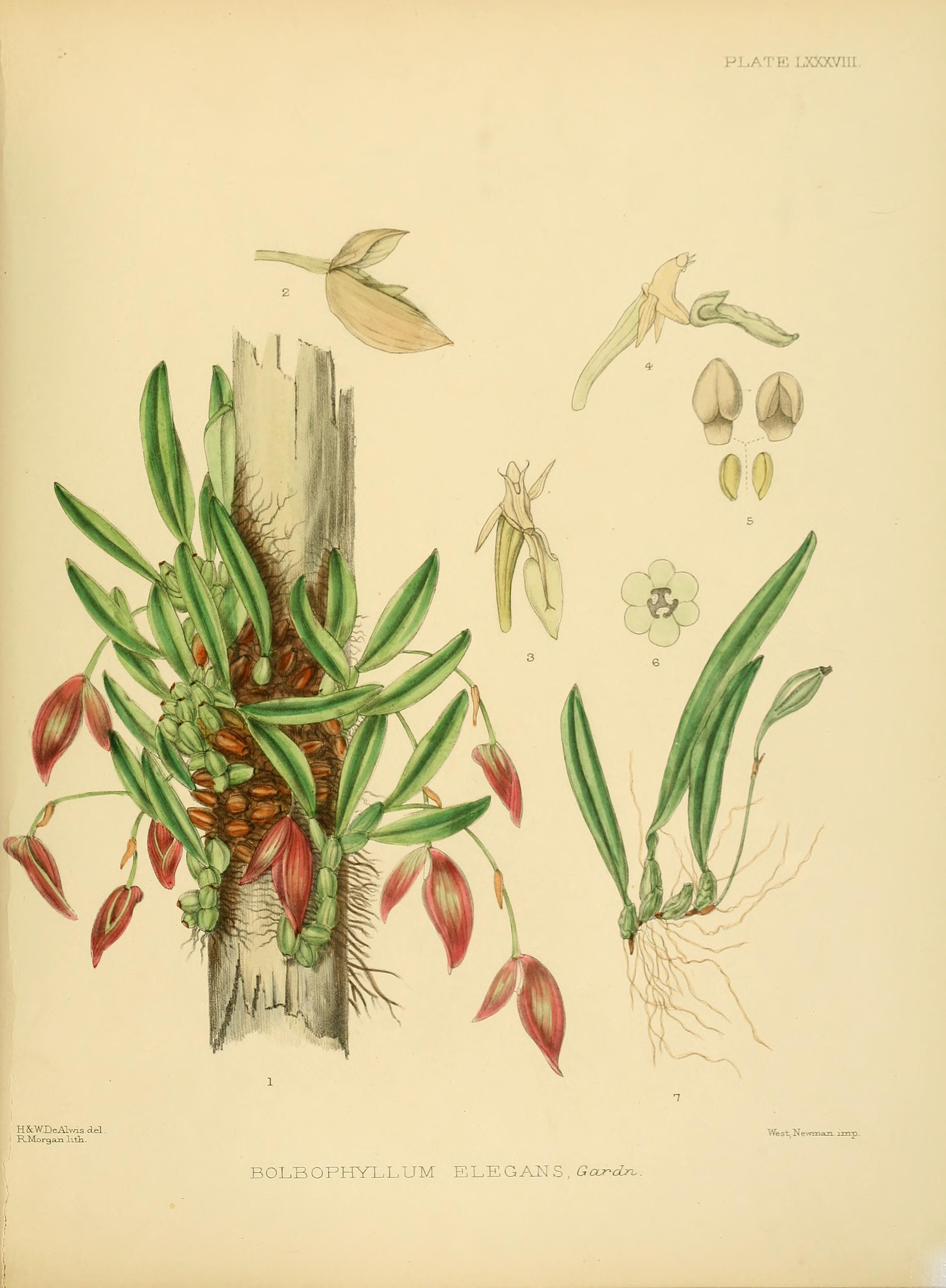

Conservation status
- CITES Appendix II (CITES)

Scientific classification
- Kingdom: Plantae
- Clade: Tracheophytes
- Clade: Angiosperms
- Clade: Monocots
- Order: Asparagales
- Family: Orchidaceae
- Subfamily: Epidendroideae
- Genus: Bulbophyllum
- Species: B. elegans

Binomial name
- Bulbophyllum elegans Gardner ex Thwaites, 1864

= Bulbophyllum elegans =

Species of orchid

Bulbophyllum elegans is a species of orchid in the genus Bulbophyllum.

== See also ==
- List of Bulbophyllum species
