= Bulbophyllum pingnanense =

Scientific classification
- Kingdom: Plantae
- Clade: Tracheophytes
- Clade: Angiosperms
- Clade: Monocots
- Order: Asparagales
- Family: Orchidaceae
- Subfamily: Epidendroideae
- Genus: Bulbophyllum
- Species: B. pingnanense

Binomial name
- Bulbophyllum pingnanense J.F.Liu, S.R.Lan & Y.C.Liang

Species of flowering plant

Bulbophyllum pingnanense is a plant in the orchid family. It grows in Fujian, China.
