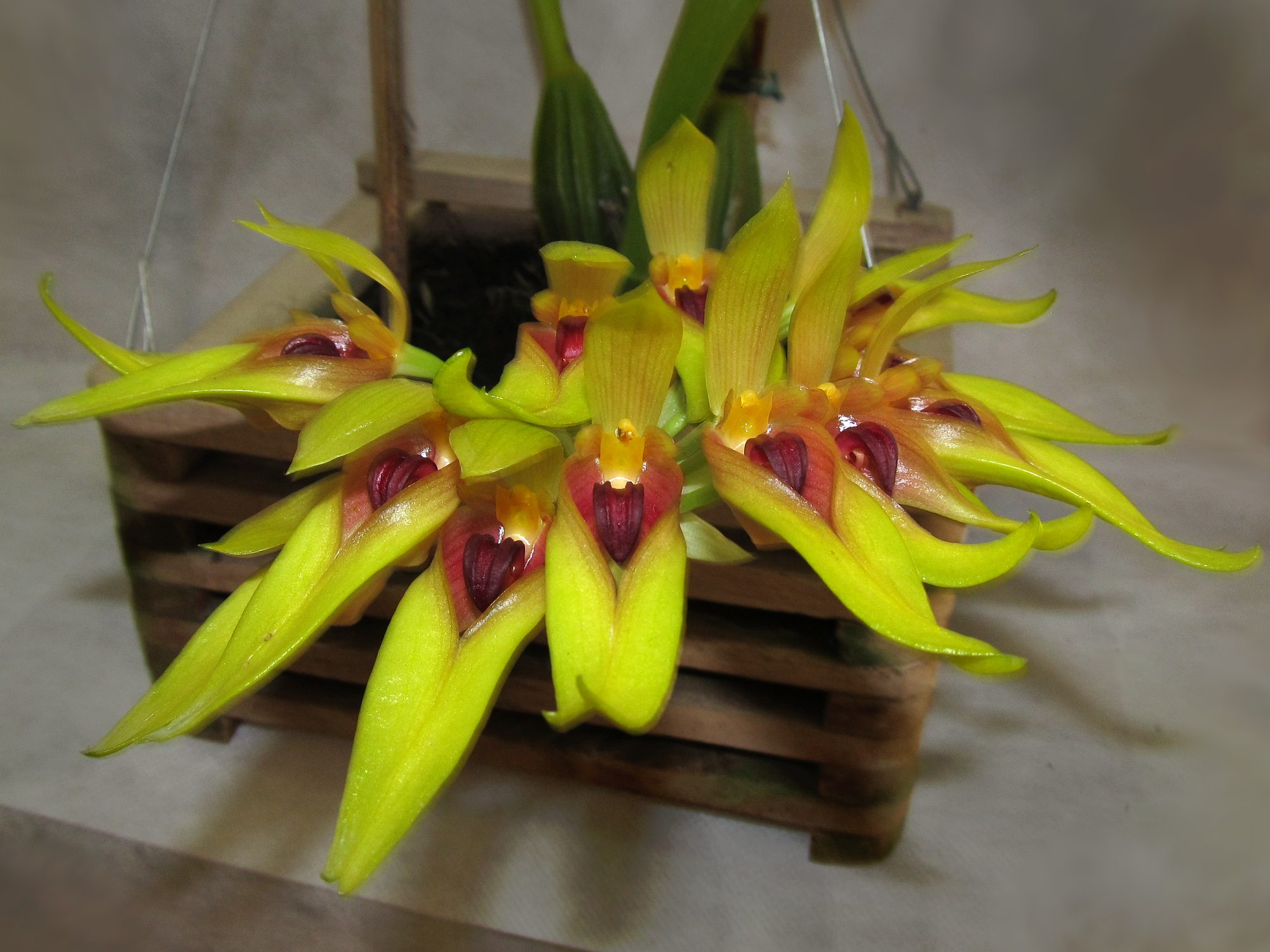

Scientific classification
- Kingdom: Plantae
- Clade: Tracheophytes
- Clade: Angiosperms
- Clade: Monocots
- Order: Asparagales
- Family: Orchidaceae
- Subfamily: Epidendroideae
- Genus: Bulbophyllum
- Species: B. graveolens

Binomial name
- Bulbophyllum graveolens (F. M. Baill.) J. J. Sm.

= Bulbophyllum graveolens =

Species of orchid

Bulbophyllum graveolens is a species of orchid in the genus Bulbophyllum.

Media related to Bulbophyllum graveolens at Wikimedia Commons
