= Bulbophyllum sect. Imitatores =

Scientific classification
- Kingdom: Plantae
- Clade: Tracheophytes
- Clade: Angiosperms
- Clade: Monocots
- Order: Asparagales
- Family: Orchidaceae
- Subfamily: Epidendroideae
- Genus: Bulbophyllum
- Section: Bulbophyllum sect. Imitatores; J.J.Verm., Schuit. & de Vogel 2014

Type species
- Bulbophyllum imitator

Species
- See text

Section of flowering plants

Bulbophyllum sect. Imitatores is a section of the genus Bulbophyllum.

== Description ==
Species in this section have small pseudobulbs with one to many flowers. It is possible to distinguish the species from those in the Macrouris by viewing the stigma.

== Distribution ==
Plants from this section are found in New Guinea.

== Species ==
Bulbophyllum section Imitatores comprises the following species:

Image	Name	Distribution	Elevation (m)
	Bulbophyllum desmotrichoides Schltr. 1913	New Guinea	200–2,000 metres (660–6,560 ft)
	Bulbophyllum dichotomum J.J.Sm. 1908	New Guinea, Solomons and Vanuatu	700–3,000 metres (2,300–9,800 ft)
	Bulbophyllum glaucum Schltr. 1913	New Guinea	800 metres (2,600 ft)
	Bulbophyllum imitator J.J.Verm. 1992	Papua New Guinea	2,800–3,000 metres (9,200–9,800 ft)
