= Bulbophyllum sect. Rhinanthera =

Scientific classification
- Kingdom: Plantae
- Clade: Tracheophytes
- Clade: Angiosperms
- Clade: Monocots
- Order: Asparagales
- Family: Orchidaceae
- Subfamily: Epidendroideae
- Genus: Bulbophyllum
- Section: Bulbophyllum sect. Rhinanthera; J J Verm, Schuit. & de Vogel 2014

Type species
- Bulbophyllum wrayi

Species
- See text

Section of flowering plants

Bulbophyllum sect. Rhinanthera is a section of the genus Bulbophyllum.

== Description ==
Species in this section have pseudobulb that are not fused peduncle with 4 to 10 bracts

== Distribution ==
Plants from this section are found in Malaysia.

== Species ==
Bulbophyllum section Rhinanthera comprises the following species:

Image	Name	Distribution	Elevation (m)
	Bulbophyllum jayjayveeanum P.O'Byrne & P.T.Ong 2018	peninsular Malaysia	2,100 metres (6,900 ft)
	Bulbophyllum tahanense Carr 1930	Malaysia	
	Bulbophyllum turpe J.J.Verm. & P.O'Byrne 2003	peninsular Malaysia	1,600–2,100 metres (5,200–6,900 ft)
	Bulbophyllum wrayi Hook.f. 1890	Malaysia, Java and Sumatra	1,000–1,650 metres (3,280–5,410 ft)
