= Bulbophyllum sect. Biseta =

Scientific classification
- Kingdom: Plantae
- Clade: Tracheophytes
- Clade: Angiosperms
- Clade: Monocots
- Order: Asparagales
- Family: Orchidaceae
- Subfamily: Epidendroideae
- Genus: Bulbophyllum
- Section: Bulbophyllum sect. Biseta; J.J.Verm. ex N.Pearce, P.J.Cribb & Renz

Type species
- Bulbophyllum bisetum

Species
- See text

Section of flowering plants

Bulbophyllum sect. Biseta is a section of the genus Bulbophyllum.

== Distribution ==
Plants from this section are found in Southeast Asia.

== Species ==
Bulbophyllum section Biflorae comprises the following species:

Image	Name	Distribution	Elevation (m)
	Bulbophyllum bisetum Lindl. 1842	India(Assam) and Thailand	1,500–2,000 metres (4,900–6,600 ft)
	Bulbophyllum bisetoides Seidenf. 1970	Thailand and Vietnam	1,300–1,400 metres (4,300–4,600 ft)
	Bulbophyllum dewildei J.J. Verm. 1996	Sumatra	1,500–1,700 metres (4,900–5,600 ft)
	Bulbophyllum emunitum J.J.Verm. & A.L.Lamb 2008	Borneo	1,100–1,600 metres (3,600–5,200 ft)
	Bulbophyllum gurungianum P. Gyeltshen, K. Rabgay & Kumar, 2023	Bhutan	
	Bulbophyllum maanshanense Z.J.Liu, L.J.Chen & W.H.Rao 2010	China (Yunnan)	
	Bulbophyllum pauzii P.O'Byrne & P.T.Ong 2014	Malaysia	1,250 metres (4,100 ft)
	Bulbophyllum sonii Aver. & Duy 2018	Vietnam, China (Xizang)	
	Bulbophyllum tipula Aver. 2016	China(Yunnan) and Vietnam	1,000–1,150 metres (3,280–3,770 ft)
