= Bulbophyllum sect. Bifarium =

Scientific classification
- Kingdom: Plantae
- Clade: Tracheophytes
- Clade: Angiosperms
- Clade: Monocots
- Order: Asparagales
- Family: Orchidaceae
- Subfamily: Epidendroideae
- Genus: Bulbophyllum
- Section: Bulbophyllum sect. Bifarium; G A Fischer & J J Verm

Type species
- Bulbophyllum bifarium

Species
- See text

Section of flowering plants

Bulbophyllum sect. Bifarium is a section of the genus Bulbophyllum.

== Description ==
Species in this section have creeping rhizomes with two leaves on the pseudobulb blooming with an inflorescence with multiple flowers.

== Distribution ==
Plants from this section are found in Cameroon, Guinea, Kenya and Liberia.

== Species ==
Bulbophyllum section Bifarium comprises the following species:

Image	Name	Distribution	Elevation (m)
	Bulbophyllum bidenticulatum J.J.Verm. 1984	Ivory Coast, Liberia, Sierra Leone, Cameroon and Kenya	900–1,200 metres (3,000–3,900 ft)
	Bulbophyllum bifarium Hook.f. 1864	Cameroon, Kenya and Angola	800–1,800 metres (2,600–5,900 ft)
