= Bulbophyllum sect. Hymenobractea =

Scientific classification
- Kingdom: Plantae
- Clade: Tracheophytes
- Clade: Angiosperms
- Clade: Monocots
- Order: Asparagales
- Family: Orchidaceae
- Subfamily: Epidendroideae
- Genus: Bulbophyllum
- Section: Bulbophyllum sect. Hymenobractea; Schltr. 1913

Type species
- Bulbophyllum infundibuliforme

Species
- See text

Section of flowering plants

Bulbophyllum sect. Hymenobractea is a section of the genus Bulbophyllum.

== Description ==
Species in this section are epiphytes with creeping rhizomes with a minute pseudobulb carrying a single leaf. Plant blooms with 1 to 10 flowered.

== Distribution ==
Plants from this section are found in Papua New Guinea.

== Species ==
Bulbophyllum section Hymenobractea comprises the following species:

Image	Name	Distribution	Elevation (m)
	Bulbophyllum aemulum Schltr. 1905	Papua New Guinea	150–900 metres (490–2,950 ft)
	Bulbophyllum infundibuliforme J.J. Sm. 1830-4	Papua New Guinea	100–600 metres (330–1,970 ft)
