= Bulbophyllum sect. Hemisterantha =

Scientific classification
- Kingdom: Plantae
- Clade: Tracheophytes
- Clade: Angiosperms
- Clade: Monocots
- Order: Asparagales
- Family: Orchidaceae
- Subfamily: Epidendroideae
- Genus: Bulbophyllum
- Section: Bulbophyllum sect. Hemisterantha; J J Verm 2014

Type species
- Bulbophyllum hemisterranthum

Species
- See text

Section of flowering plants

Bulbophyllum sect. Hemisterantha is a section of the genus Bulbophyllum.

== Description ==
Species in this section have rhizomes that are creeping. The plants produce a single inflorescence with one leaf and one flower.

== Distribution ==
Plants from this section are found in Sulawesi.

== Species ==
Bulbophyllum section Hemisterantha comprises the following species:

| Image | Name | Distribution | Elevation (m) |
|---|---|---|---|
| | Bulbophyllum hemisterranthum J.J.Verm. & P.O'Byrne 2008 | Sulawesi | 1,200 metres (3,900 ft) |
| | Bulbophyllum pachyneuron Schltr. 1911 | Sulawesi | 1,000 metres (3,300 ft) |
