= Oncophyllum =

Scientific classification
- Kingdom: Plantae
- Clade: Embryophytes
- Clade: Tracheophytes
- Clade: Spermatophytes
- Clade: Angiosperms
- Clade: Monocots
- Order: Asparagales
- Family: Orchidaceae
- Subfamily: Epidendroideae
- Tribe: Dendrobieae
- Subtribe: Oncophyllinae
- Genus: Oncophyllum; Jones & Clements, 2001

Species
- 2 species: Onch. globuliforme Onch. minutissimum

Synonyms
- Bulbophyllum

Genus of orchids

Oncophyllum is a genus in the orchid family, Orchidaceae, consisting of only two small species endemic to Australia, and previously classified as being in Bulbophyllum.

== Description ==
This genus was first described in 2001 by D. L. Jones and M. A. Clements, and "... segregated from Bulbophyllum based on tiny pseudobulbs with a small internal cavity near the apex, a single tiny bract-like leaf on each pseudobulb, single-flowered inflorescence arising from the base of a pseudobulb and small flowers with a warty ovary." They grow in many habitats ranging from very exposed to relatively sheltered. They are pollinated by insects and are fairly easy to cultivate on a hard slab with reasonably bright light, high humidity and good ventilation, and regular watering all year.

Type species: Bulbophyllum minutissimum F.Muell.

== Conservation status ==
O. globuliforme is considered "vulnerable", but O. minutissimum is widely distributed and common in Queensland and New South Wales from the Blackdown Tableland to Bateman's Bay.
