= Bulbophyllum sect. Phreatiopsis =

Scientific classification
- Kingdom: Plantae
- Clade: Tracheophytes
- Clade: Angiosperms
- Clade: Monocots
- Order: Asparagales
- Family: Orchidaceae
- Subfamily: Epidendroideae
- Genus: Bulbophyllum
- Section: Bulbophyllum sect. Phreatiopsis; J.J.Verm. & P.O'Byrne

Type species
- Bulbophyllum phreatiopse

Species
- See text

Section of flowering plants

Bulbophyllum sect. Phreatiopsis is a section of the genus Bulbophyllum.

== Description ==
Species in this section have triangular callus on the adaxial side of the lip.

== Distribution ==
Plants from this section are found in peninsular Malaysia, Borneo, Sulawesi and New Guinea.

== Species ==
Bulbophyllum section Phreatiopsis comprises the following species:

Image	Name	Distribution	Elevation (m)
	Bulbophyllum phreatiopse J.J.Verm. 1993	New Guinea	1,300–1,500 metres (4,300–4,900 ft)
	Bulbophyllum viridescens Ridl. 1908	peninsular Malaysia, Borneo and Sulawesi	1,100–2,000 metres (3,600–6,600 ft)
