= Bulbophyllum sect. Inversiflora =

Scientific classification
- Kingdom: Plantae
- Clade: Tracheophytes
- Clade: Angiosperms
- Clade: Monocots
- Order: Asparagales
- Family: Orchidaceae
- Subfamily: Epidendroideae
- Genus: Bulbophyllum
- Section: Bulbophyllum sect. Inversiflora; G.A. Fischer & P.J. Cribb ex G.A. Fischer & J.J. Verm. 2014

Type species
- Bulbophyllum cardiobulbum

Species
- See text

Section of flowering plants

Bulbophyllum sect. Inversiflora is a section of the genus Bulbophyllum.

== Description ==
Species in this section have creeping rhizomes with laterally flattened, adpressed pseudobulb with two leaves.

== Distribution ==
Plants from this section are found in Madagascar.

== Species ==
Bulbophyllum section Inversiflora comprises the following species:

Image	Name	Distribution	Elevation (m)
	Bulbophyllum cardiobulbum Bosser 1965	Madagascar (Antananarivo)	939–1,324 metres (3,081–4,344 ft)
	Bulbophyllum cochinealloides Hermans & Gamisch 2021	Madagascar	1,200 metres (3,900 ft)
	Bulbophyllum uroplatoides Hermans & G.A.Fisch. 2009	Madagascar	1,050 metres (3,440 ft)
