= Bulbophyllum sect. Monosepalum =

Scientific classification
- Kingdom: Plantae
- Clade: Tracheophytes
- Clade: Angiosperms
- Clade: Monocots
- Order: Asparagales
- Family: Orchidaceae
- Subfamily: Epidendroideae
- Genus: Bulbophyllum
- Section: Bulbophyllum sect. Monosepalum (Schltr.) J.J. Sm. 1916

Type species
- Bulbophyllum muricatum

Species
- See text

Synonyms
- Monosepalum Schltr.

Section of flowering plants

Bulbophyllum sect. Monosepalum is a section of the genus Bulbophyllum.

== Description ==
Species in this section are distinguished by having a pendent, resupinate flower with the node at the base of the pedicel.

== Distribution ==
Plants from this section are found in New Guinea.

== Species ==
Bulbophyllum section Monosepalum comprises the following species:

Image	Name	Distribution	Elevation (m)
	Bulbophyllum deuterodischorense J.M.H.Shaw 2014	Sulawesi and New Guinea	1,300 metres (4,300 ft)
	Bulbophyllum muricatum J.J.Sm. 1911	Papua New Guinea	1,900–3,250 metres (6,230–10,660 ft)
	Bulbophyllum neotorricellense J.M.H.Shaw 2014	New Guinea	800 metres (2,600 ft)
