= Bulbophyllum sect. Pseudopelma =

Scientific classification
- Kingdom: Plantae
- Clade: Tracheophytes
- Clade: Angiosperms
- Clade: Monocots
- Order: Asparagales
- Family: Orchidaceae
- Subfamily: Epidendroideae
- Genus: Bulbophyllum
- Section: Bulbophyllum sect. Pseudopelma; J.J. Verm. & P. O'Byrne 2003

Type species
- Bulbophyllum pseudopelma

Species
- See text

Section of flowering plants

Bulbophyllum sect. Pseudopelma is a section of the genus Bulbophyllum.

== Description ==
Species in this section have coarsely papillose roots and finely and densely papillose rhizome bracts.

== Distribution ==
Plants from this section are found in Sulawesi.

== Species ==
Bulbophyllum section Pseudopelma comprises the following species:

Image	Name	Distribution	Elevation (m)
	Bulbophyllum fossatum J.J.Verm. & O'Byrne 2011	Sulawesi	1,000–1,200 metres (3,300–3,900 ft)
	Bulbophyllum pseudopelma J.J.Verm. & P.O'Byrne 2003	Sulawesi	1,900–2,500 metres (6,200–8,200 ft)
