= Bulbophyllum tokioi =

Conservation status
- Endangered (IUCN 3.1)

Scientific classification
- Kingdom: Plantae
- Clade: Tracheophytes
- Clade: Angiosperms
- Clade: Monocots
- Order: Asparagales
- Family: Orchidaceae
- Subfamily: Epidendroideae
- Genus: Bulbophyllum
- Species: B. tokioi

Binomial name
- Bulbophyllum tokioi Fukuy.

Species of orchid

Bulbophyllum tokioi is a species of plant in the family Orchidaceae. It is endemic to Taiwan (has been found in the north and central regions in or near Taipei, Hsinchu and Taichung). It was described in 1935 by Noriaki Fukuyama.

== Identification ==
B. tokioi has creeping rhizomes (0.5 mm diam.), lacking pseudobulbs. Its fleshy, sessile, glabrous leaves are minute (5–6 mm long by 3-4.5 mm wide), elliptic or elliptic-orbicular, acute or obtuse, some having tiny, membranaceous sheaths at base. It has axillary scapes (1–3 cm long) that are slender and erect, with a few sheaths close by its base. Bracts are elliptic and acute.

B. tokioi has two palely yellowed flowers, sometimes having red spots or striations. Its three-nerved, dorsal sepals are membranaceous and hairless. One of these (2.5-3.8 mm long by 1–2 mm wide) is oblong, while other lateral ones (2.6–4 mm long by 1.5–2 mm wide) are obliquely triangular and elliptic. Its single-nerved petals (1.3-2.4 mm long by 0.6–1 mm wide) are oblong. Its lip is attached to the apex of its thin, un-hornlike column foot (2-2.4 mm long by 1 mm wide) is ovate-triangular and purple-tinged, with a rounded to obtuse apex, and a base decurrent into a long, entire, glabrous, membranaceous, three-nerved claw. The column (0.8–1 mm long), has stubby stylids at its apex, and its foot is 2 mm long. Its triangularly conic anther is white with an area of red, and its two pollinia are ovoid to ellipsoid.
