= Bulbophyllum moratii =

Conservation status
- Critically Endangered (IUCN 3.1)

Scientific classification
- Kingdom: Plantae
- Clade: Embryophytes
- Clade: Tracheophytes
- Clade: Spermatophytes
- Clade: Angiosperms
- Clade: Monocots
- Order: Asparagales
- Family: Orchidaceae
- Subfamily: Epidendroideae
- Genus: Bulbophyllum
- Species: B. moratii

Binomial name
- Bulbophyllum moratii Bosser

Species of orchid

Bulbophyllum moratii is a species of orchid in the genus Bulbophyllum. It is a pseudobulbous epiphyte native to northern and northeastern Madagascar. It grows in subhumid forests from 1,000 to 1,499 metres elevation. It is critically endangered due to illegal collection and logging.
