= Bulbophyllum sect. Gongorodes =

Scientific classification
- Kingdom: Plantae
- Clade: Tracheophytes
- Clade: Angiosperms
- Clade: Monocots
- Order: Asparagales
- Family: Orchidaceae
- Subfamily: Epidendroideae
- Genus: Bulbophyllum
- Section: Bulbophyllum sect. Gongorodes; J. J. Sm 1914

Type species
- Bulbophyllum digitatum

Species
- See text

Section of flowering plants

Bulbophyllum sect. Gongorodes is a section of the genus Bulbophyllum.

== Description ==
Species in this section are distinguished by folded or incised petal tips.

== Distribution ==
Plants from this section are found in New Guinea.

== Species ==
Bulbophyllum section Gongorodes comprises the following species:

Image	Name	Distribution	Elevation (m)
	Bulbophyllum digitatum J.J.Sm. 1911	New Guinea	900 metres (3,000 ft)
	Bulbophyllum scorpio J.J.Verm. 2008	Papua New Guinea	
