= Bulbophyllum modicum =

Conservation status
- Endangered (IUCN 2.3)

Scientific classification
- Kingdom: Plantae
- Clade: Tracheophytes
- Clade: Angiosperms
- Clade: Monocots
- Order: Asparagales
- Family: Orchidaceae
- Subfamily: Epidendroideae
- Genus: Bulbophyllum
- Species: B. modicum

Binomial name
- Bulbophyllum modicum Summerh.

Species of orchid

Bulbophyllum modicum is a possibly extinct, epiphytic plant species in the family Orchidaceae. It is endemic to Cameroon, and its natural habitat (montane subtropical or tropical dry forests of Mount Cameroon between 900 and 1,200 meters elevation) is threatened. It was described in 1957.

All (3) confirmed collections of B. modicum come from the outskirts of the town of Buea. One other collection from Bambui (Bamenda) is sterile, and has yet to be confirmed as being this species.

Possible threats to B. modicum, if it is still extant, all arise from the intensive clearing of its forest habitat, whether for the purposes of obtaining firewood, the cultivation of crops, or the expansion of housebuilding.
