= Bulbophyllum denticulatum =

Scientific classification
- Kingdom: Plantae
- Clade: Tracheophytes
- Clade: Angiosperms
- Clade: Monocots
- Order: Asparagales
- Family: Orchidaceae
- Subfamily: Epidendroideae
- Genus: Bulbophyllum
- Species: B. denticulatum

Binomial name
- Bulbophyllum denticulatum Rolfe

Species of orchid

Bulbophyllum denticulatum is a species of orchid in the genus Bulbophyllum found from Ivory Coast, Sierra Leone, and Liberia at elevations of 900 meters.
