= Bulbophyllum petrae =

Conservation status
- Endangered (IUCN 3.1)

Scientific classification
- Kingdom: Plantae
- Clade: Tracheophytes
- Clade: Angiosperms
- Clade: Monocots
- Order: Asparagales
- Family: Orchidaceae
- Subfamily: Epidendroideae
- Genus: Bulbophyllum
- Species: B. petrae

Binomial name
- Bulbophyllum petrae G.A.Fisch., Sieder & P.J.Cribb

Species of plant

Bulbophyllum petrae is a pseudobulbous epiphyte and grows primarily in wet tropical regions of East Central Madagascar.
