= Bulbophyllum pseudohydra =

Scientific classification
- Kingdom: Plantae
- Clade: Tracheophytes
- Clade: Angiosperms
- Clade: Monocots
- Order: Asparagales
- Family: Orchidaceae
- Subfamily: Epidendroideae
- Genus: Bulbophyllum
- Species: B. pseudohydra

Binomial name
- Bulbophyllum pseudohydra (Summerh.) J.M.H.Shaw

Synonyms
- Chaseella pseudohydra Summerh.

Genus of orchids

Bulbophyllum pseudohydra is a species of epiphytic orchid, formerly the sole species in Bulbophyllum sect. Chaseella [Summerh.] G A Fischer & J J. It is endemic to the Honde and Haroni Valleys of Zimbabwe. It has also been reported from Kenya, although this remains to be confirmed.
