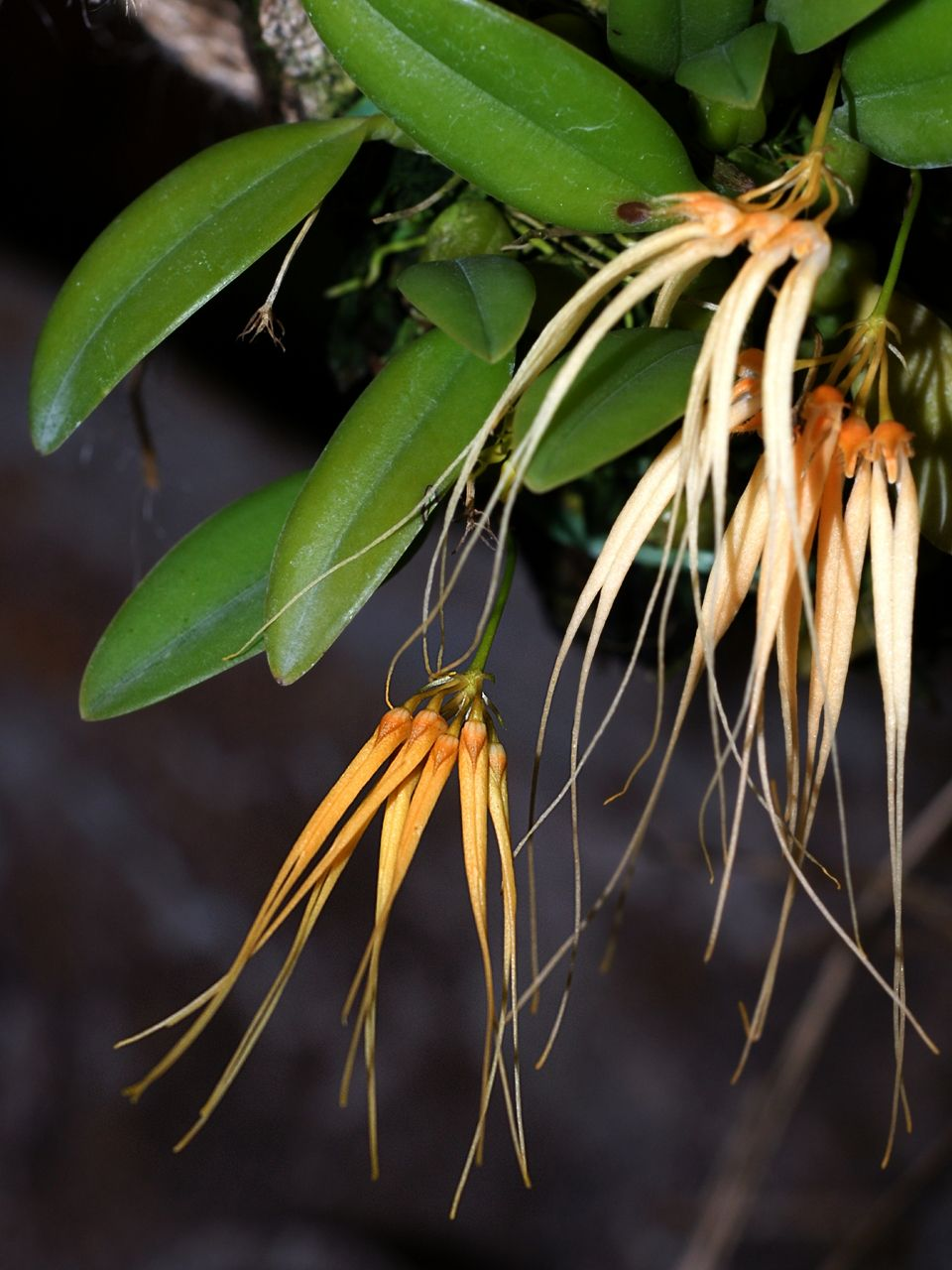

Scientific classification
- Kingdom: Plantae
- Clade: Tracheophytes
- Clade: Angiosperms
- Clade: Monocots
- Order: Asparagales
- Family: Orchidaceae
- Subfamily: Epidendroideae
- Genus: Bulbophyllum
- Species: B. pecten-veneris

Binomial name
- Bulbophyllum pecten-veneris (Gagnep.) Seidenf.

Synonyms
- Cirrhopetalum pectenveneris Gagnep. (1931) (Basionym); Bulbophyllum tingabarinum Garay, Hamer & Siegerist (1994); Cirrhopetalum miniatum Rolfe (1913); Cirrhopetalum flaviflorum Tang (1971); Bulbophyllum flaviflorum (Tang, S.Liu & H.Y.Su) Seidenf. (1973)

= Bulbophyllum pecten-veneris =

Yellow-flowered Bulbophyllum

Species of orchid

Bulbophyllum pecten-veneris is a flowering plant in the family Orchidaceae. It is a species of orchid that is also known as the yellow-flowered bulbophyllum or golden comb orchid.
