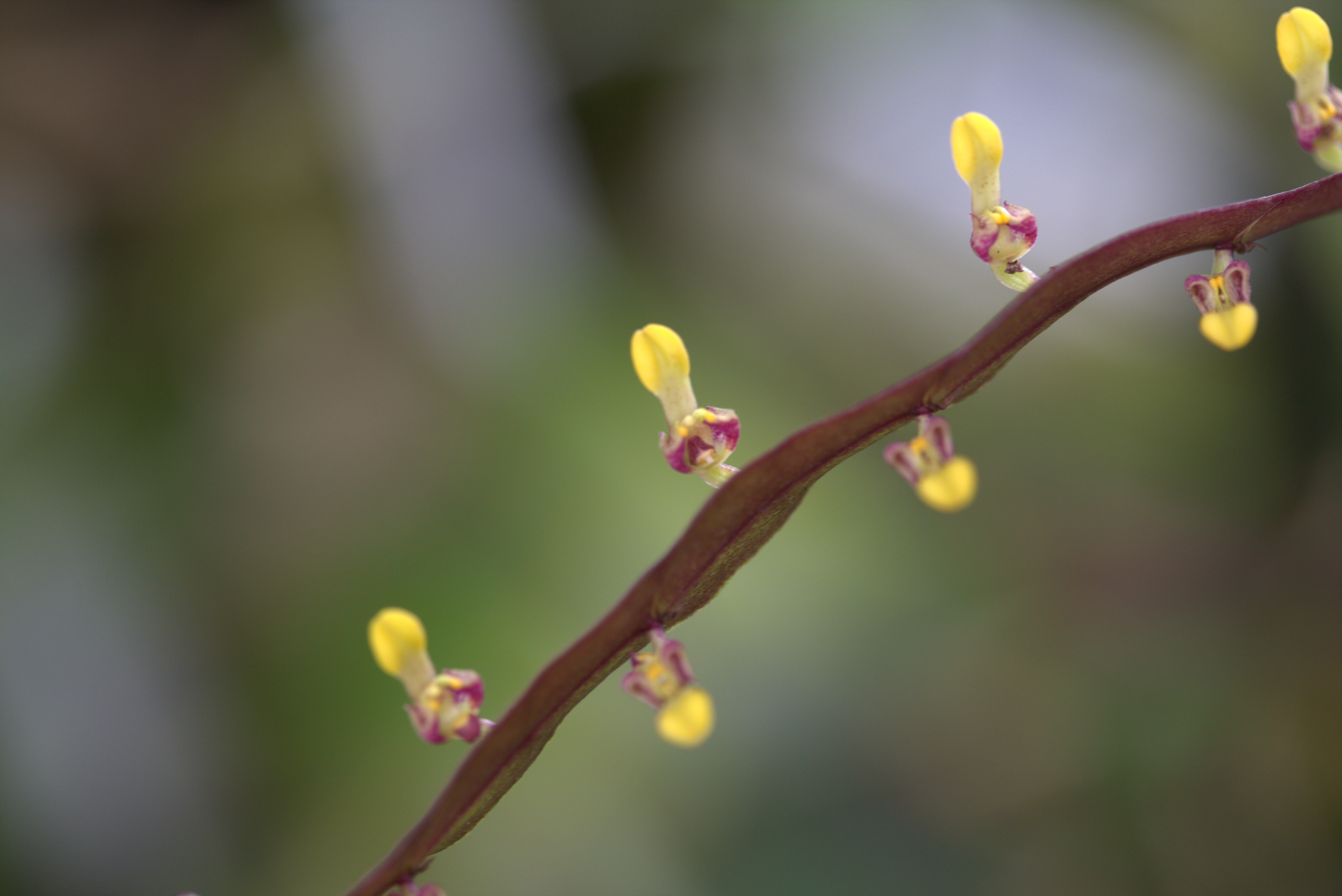

Scientific classification
- Kingdom: Plantae
- Clade: Tracheophytes
- Clade: Angiosperms
- Clade: Monocots
- Order: Asparagales
- Family: Orchidaceae
- Subfamily: Epidendroideae
- Genus: Bulbophyllum
- Species: B. falcatum

Binomial name
- Bulbophyllum falcatum (Lindl.) Rchb.f. (1861)

Synonyms
- Megaclinium falcatum Lindl. (1826) (Basionym); Phyllorkis falcata (Lindl.) Kuntze (1891); Megaclinium oxyodon Rchb.f. (1888); Bulbophyllum leptorrhachis Schltr. (1905); Megaclinium endotrachys Kraenzl. (1905); Megaclinium hernirhachis Pfitzer (1908); Megaclinium ugandae Rolfe (1913); Bulbophyllum dahlemense Schltr. (1919); Bulbophyllum ugandae (Rolfe) De Wild. (1921)

= Bulbophyllum falcatum =

Species of orchid

Bulbophyllum falcatum is a species of plant in the family Orchidaceae endemic to tropical Africa from Sierra Leone up to the Congo and western Uganda. It is a member of the section Megaclinium. It has rachis shaped like a wing that are about 10 cm long and 8–10 mm thick. On each side of the rachis are a row of flowers with 10-15 flowers per row. The sepals of the flowers are a dark red and the petals are extremely small and resemble a thread. Of the floral parts the dorsal sepal is the biggest being 8–9 mm long and visually the most prominent part of the flower. Towards the end of the dorsal sepal there is a yellow thicker area.
