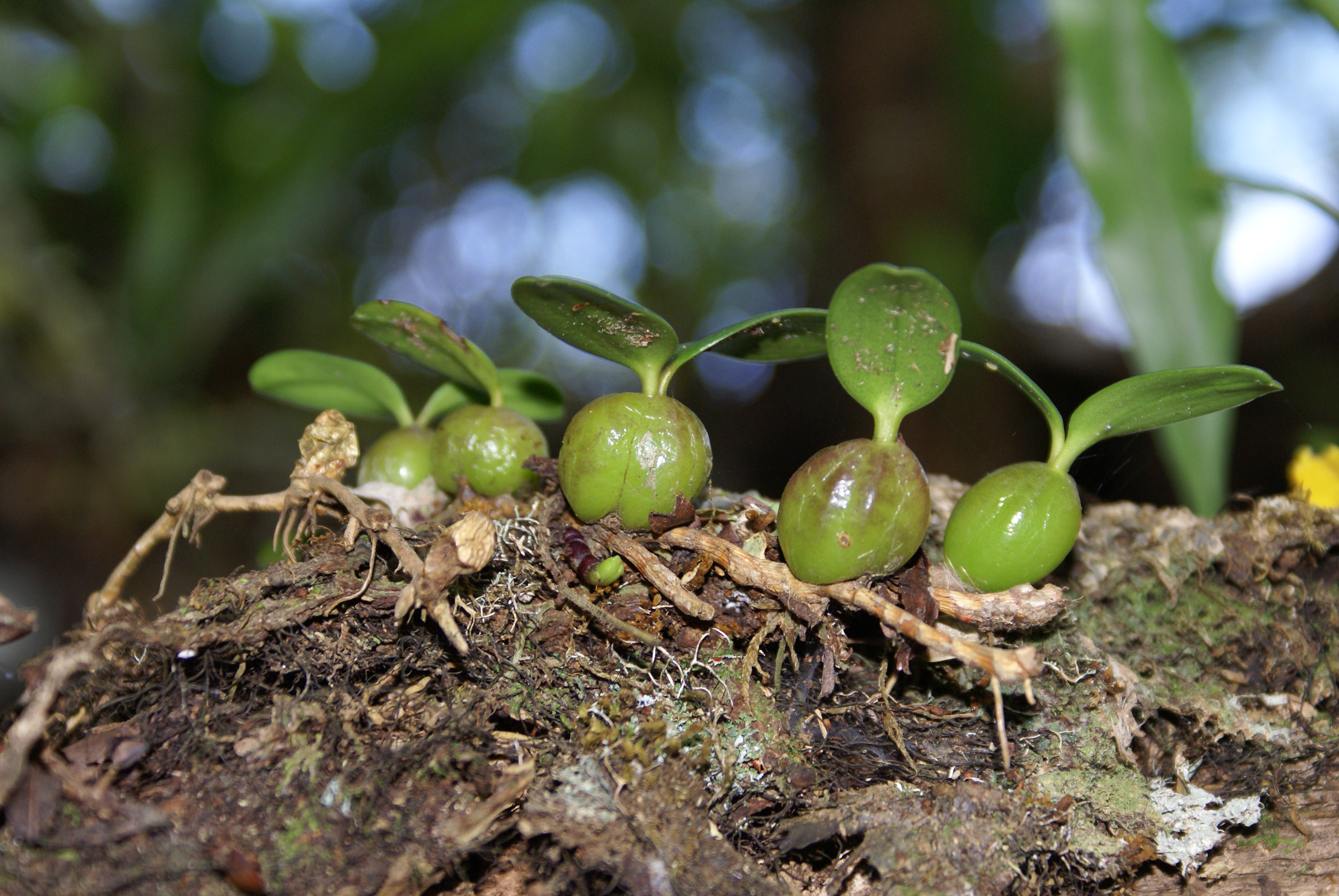

Conservation status
- CITES Appendix II

Scientific classification
- Kingdom: Plantae
- Clade: Embryophytes
- Clade: Tracheophytes
- Clade: Angiosperms
- Clade: Monocots
- Order: Asparagales
- Family: Orchidaceae
- Subfamily: Epidendroideae
- Genus: Bulbophyllum
- Species: B. nutans

Binomial name
- Bulbophyllum nutans (Thouars) Thouars (1822)

Synonyms
- Phyllorkis nutans Thouars 1819; Bulbophyllum andringitranum Schltr. 1924; Bulbophyllum variifolium Schltr. 1924; Bulbophyllum ambohitrense H.Perrier 1937; Bulbophyllum tsinjoarivense H.Perrier 1937

= Bulbophyllum nutans =

Species of orchid

Bulbophyllum nutans is a species of epiphytic orchid native to Madagascar and the Mascarene Islands in the family of Orchidaceae.

They form into a cluster, creating a group of green-like bulb appearance that form pseudobulbs with cotyledon-like leaves on top that usually has two leaves.

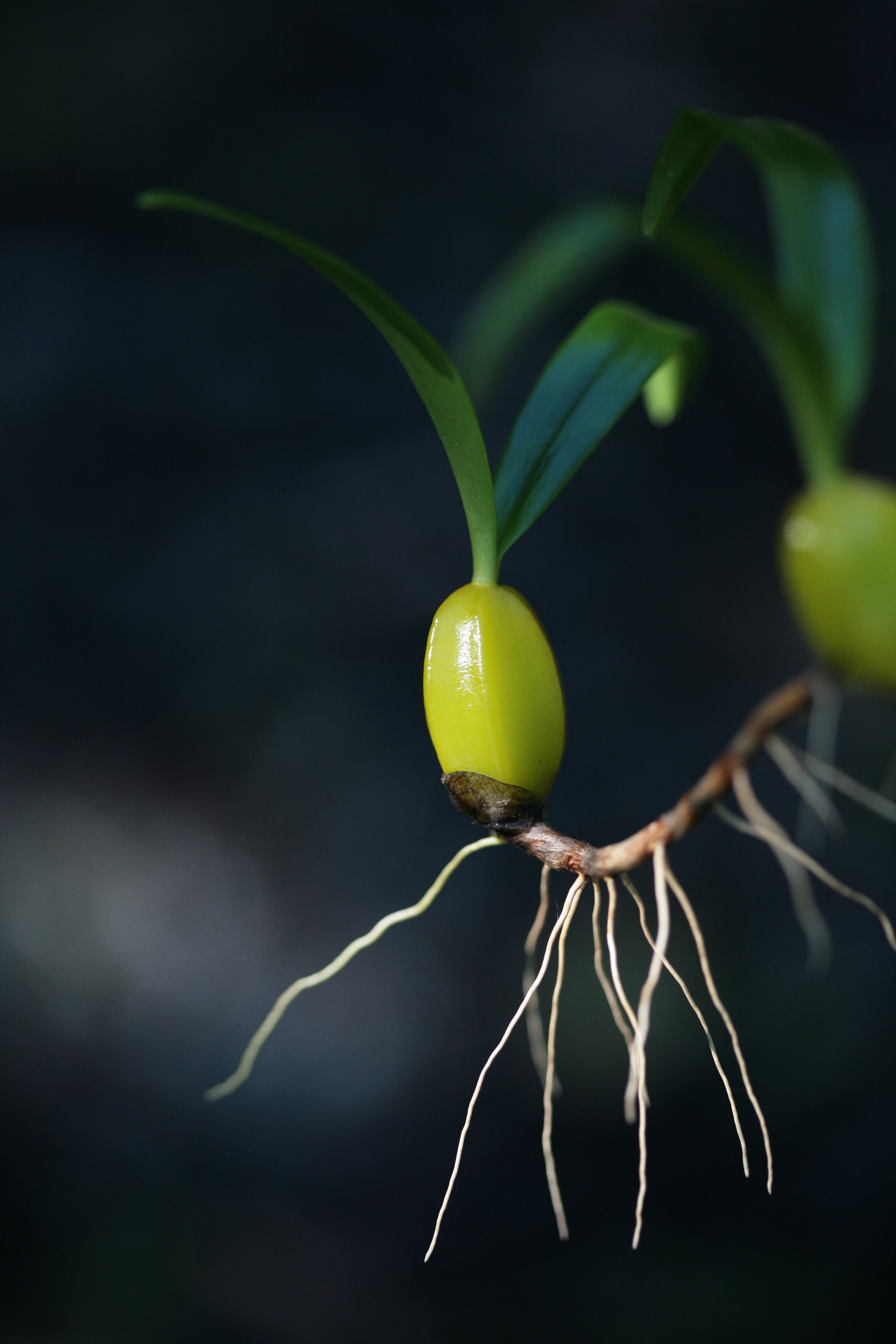
Pseudobulbs from Bulbophyllum nutans

The orchids form an inflorescence of white-golden like flowers that shoot out from beneath the orchid's pseudobulbs.
