= Bulbophyllum aemulum =

Scientific classification
- Kingdom: Plantae
- Clade: Tracheophytes
- Clade: Angiosperms
- Clade: Monocots
- Order: Asparagales
- Family: Orchidaceae
- Subfamily: Epidendroideae
- Genus: Bulbophyllum
- Species: B. aemulum

Binomial name
- Bulbophyllum aemulum Schltr.

Synonyms
- Bulbophyllum dubium J.J.Sm.

Species of orchid from New Guinea

Bulbophyllum aemulum is a species of orchid in the genus Bulbophyllum. It is native to Papua New Guinea.
