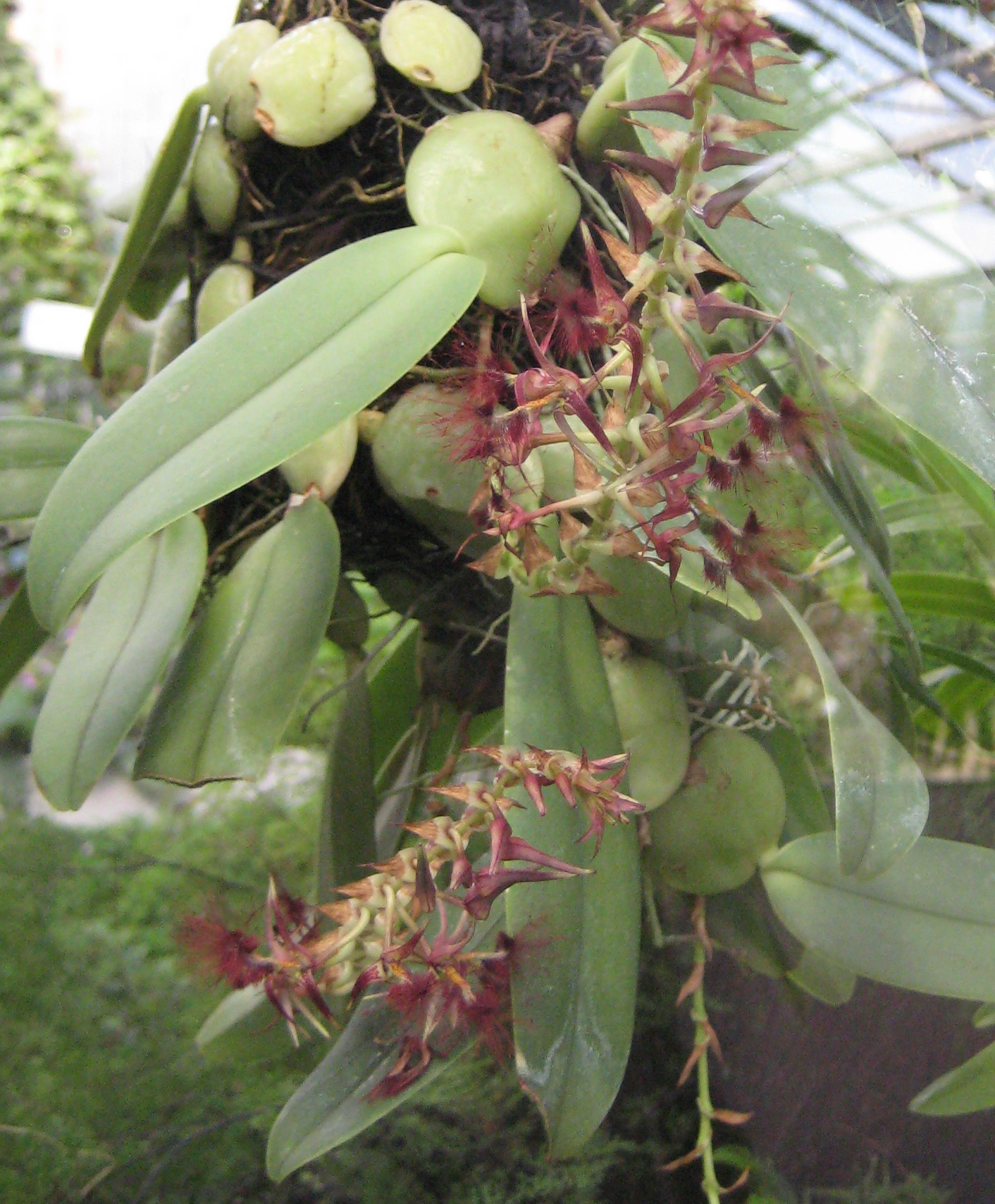

Scientific classification
- Kingdom: Plantae
- Clade: Tracheophytes
- Clade: Angiosperms
- Clade: Monocots
- Order: Asparagales
- Family: Orchidaceae
- Subfamily: Epidendroideae
- Genus: Bulbophyllum
- Species: B. barbigerum

Binomial name
- Bulbophyllum barbigerum Lindl. (1837)

Synonyms
- Phyllorkis barbigera (Lindl.) Kuntze (1891)

= Bulbophyllum barbigerum =

Bearded bulbophyllum

Species of orchid from Africa

Bulbophyllum barbigerum (bearded bulbophyllum) is a species of orchid found in parts of West and Central Africa. The flowers are hairy and have an unpleasant odor.
