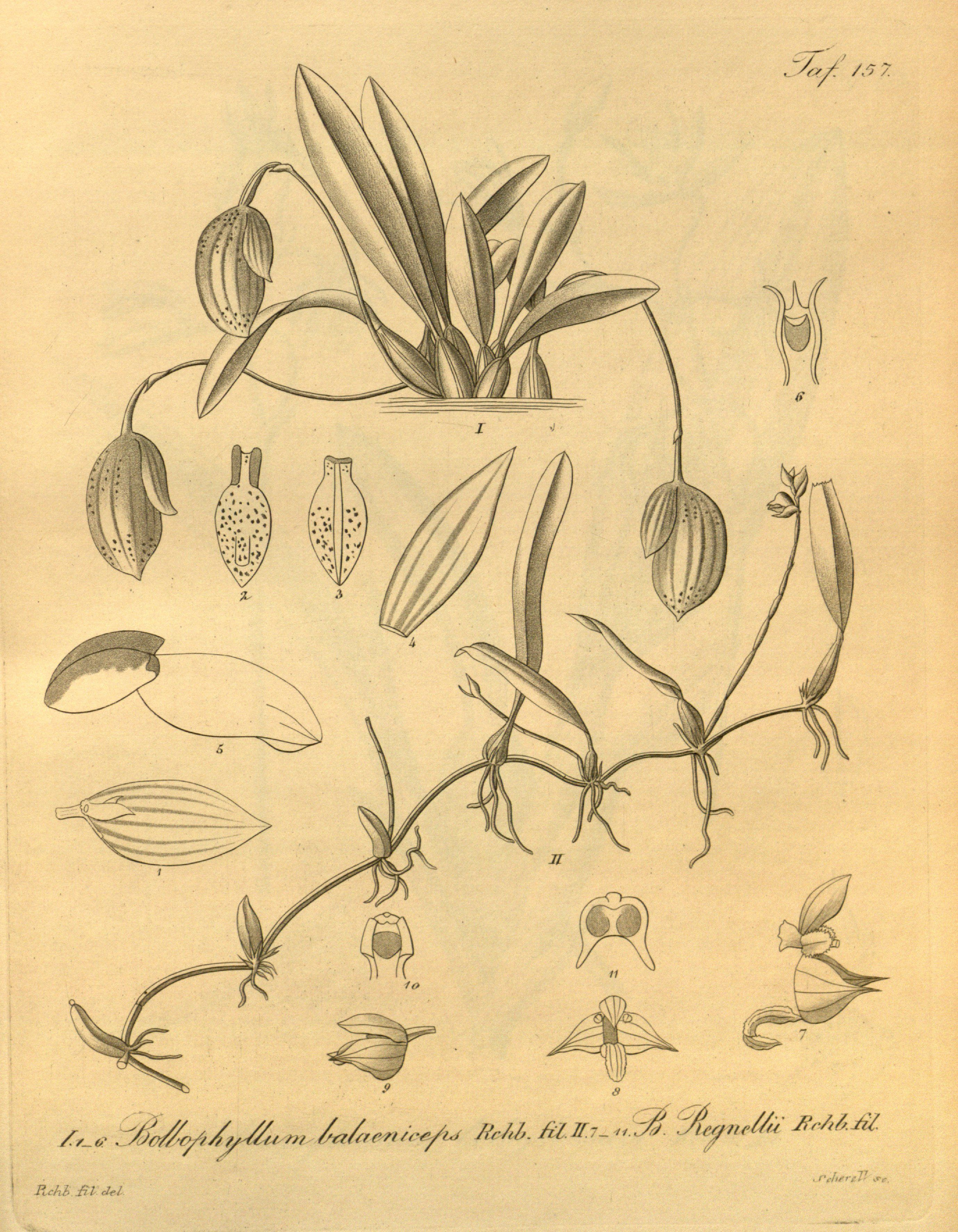
- Diagram by Heinrich Gustav Reichenbach, 1874

Scientific classification
- Kingdom: Plantae
- Clade: Tracheophytes
- Clade: Angiosperms
- Clade: Monocots
- Order: Asparagales
- Family: Orchidaceae
- Subfamily: Epidendroideae
- Genus: Bulbophyllum
- Species: B. napellii

Binomial name
- Bulbophyllum napellii Lindl.

Synonyms
- Bulbophyllum balaeniceps

= Bulbophyllum napellii =

Species of orchid

Bulbophyllum napellii is a species of epiphytic orchid in the genus Bulbophyllum. It is native to western Brazil and Argentina.
