= Bulbophyllum gilgianum =

Scientific classification
- Kingdom: Plantae
- Clade: Tracheophytes
- Clade: Angiosperms
- Clade: Monocots
- Order: Asparagales
- Family: Orchidaceae
- Subfamily: Epidendroideae
- Genus: Bulbophyllum
- Species: B. gilgianum

Binomial name
- Bulbophyllum gilgianum Kraenzl. 1899

Species of orchid

Bulbophyllum gilgianum is a species of orchid in the genus Bulbophyllum section Gilgiana. The Plant is found in Malawi.
