= Bulbophyllum jaapii =

Conservation status
- Critically Endangered (IUCN 3.1)

Scientific classification
- Kingdom: Plantae
- Clade: Embryophytes
- Clade: Tracheophytes
- Clade: Spermatophytes
- Clade: Angiosperms
- Clade: Monocots
- Order: Asparagales
- Family: Orchidaceae
- Subfamily: Epidendroideae
- Genus: Bulbophyllum
- Species: B. jaapii

Binomial name
- Bulbophyllum jaapii Szlach. & Olszewski

Species of orchid

Bulbophyllum jaapii is a species of plant in the family Orchidaceae. It is endemic to Cameroon. Its natural habitat is subtropical or tropical moist montane forests. It was described botanically in 2001.

The distribution and range of B. jaapii is extremely limited; confined entirely to the summit forests and scrublands of a singular mountain in Cameroon (Mount Kupe, a dormant volcano on the Western High Plateau), at elevations of approximately 1,800 meters. It was first collected in November (during flowering), 1985 as a new discovery by D.W. Thomas and H.L. MacLeod, whom characterized them as locally common. However, despite several detailed surveys of the area a decade later, no further specimens have been collected.

Although its habitat is situated above the elevation where local human activity could pose a significant threat, B. jaapii is more subject to catastrophic reduction in population from a singular event, such as a mudslide or forest fire, owing to its extremely small and isolated range.
