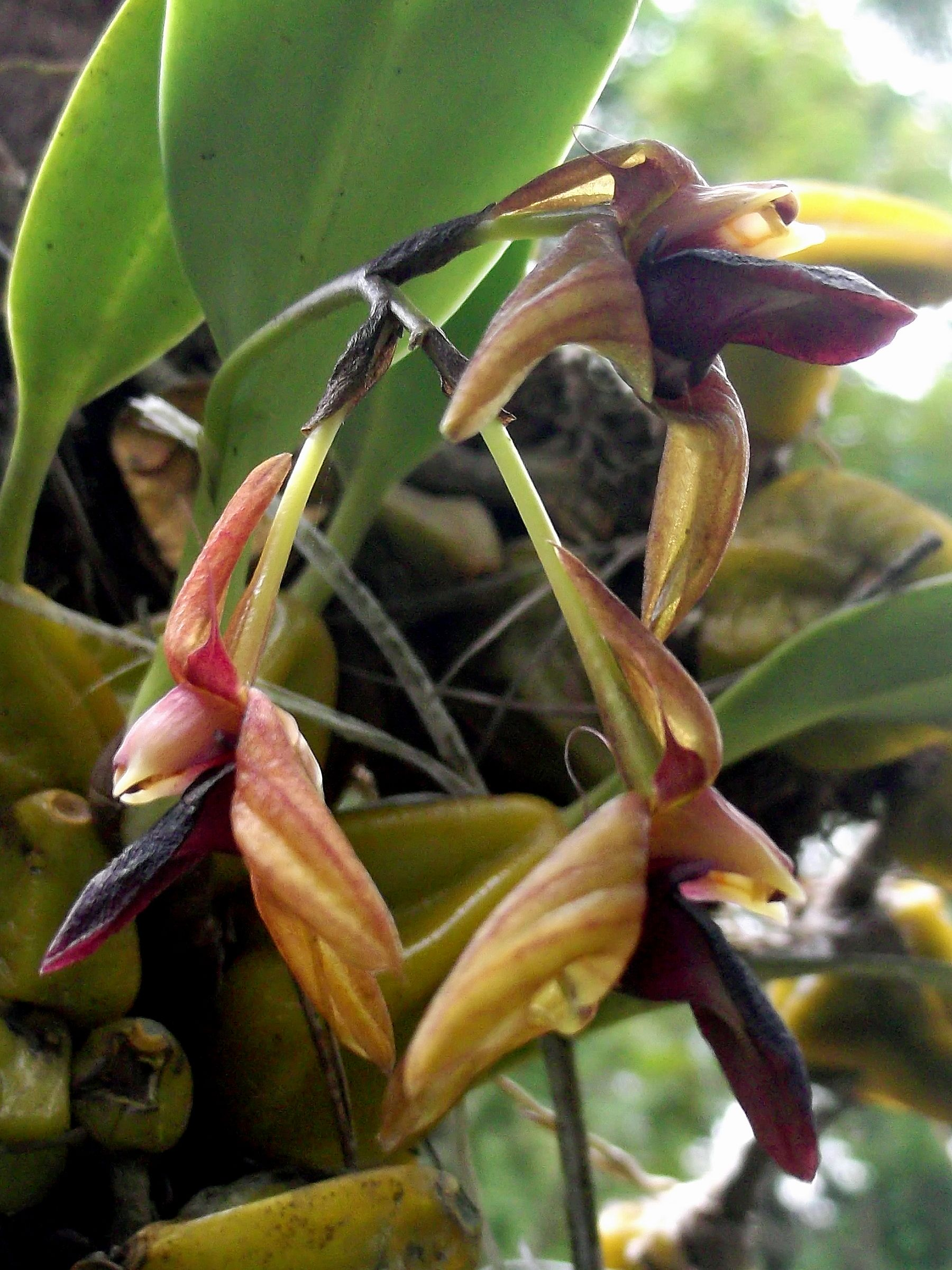

Scientific classification
- Kingdom: Plantae
- Clade: Tracheophytes
- Clade: Angiosperms
- Clade: Monocots
- Order: Asparagales
- Family: Orchidaceae
- Subfamily: Epidendroideae
- Genus: Bulbophyllum
- Species: B. fuscopurpureum

Binomial name
- Bulbophyllum fuscopurpureum Wight 1851

= Bulbophyllum fuscopurpureum =

Species of orchid

Bulbophyllum fuscopurpureum is a species of orchid in the genus Bulbophyllum.

== Distribution ==
Plants are found in the Western Ghats of India.
