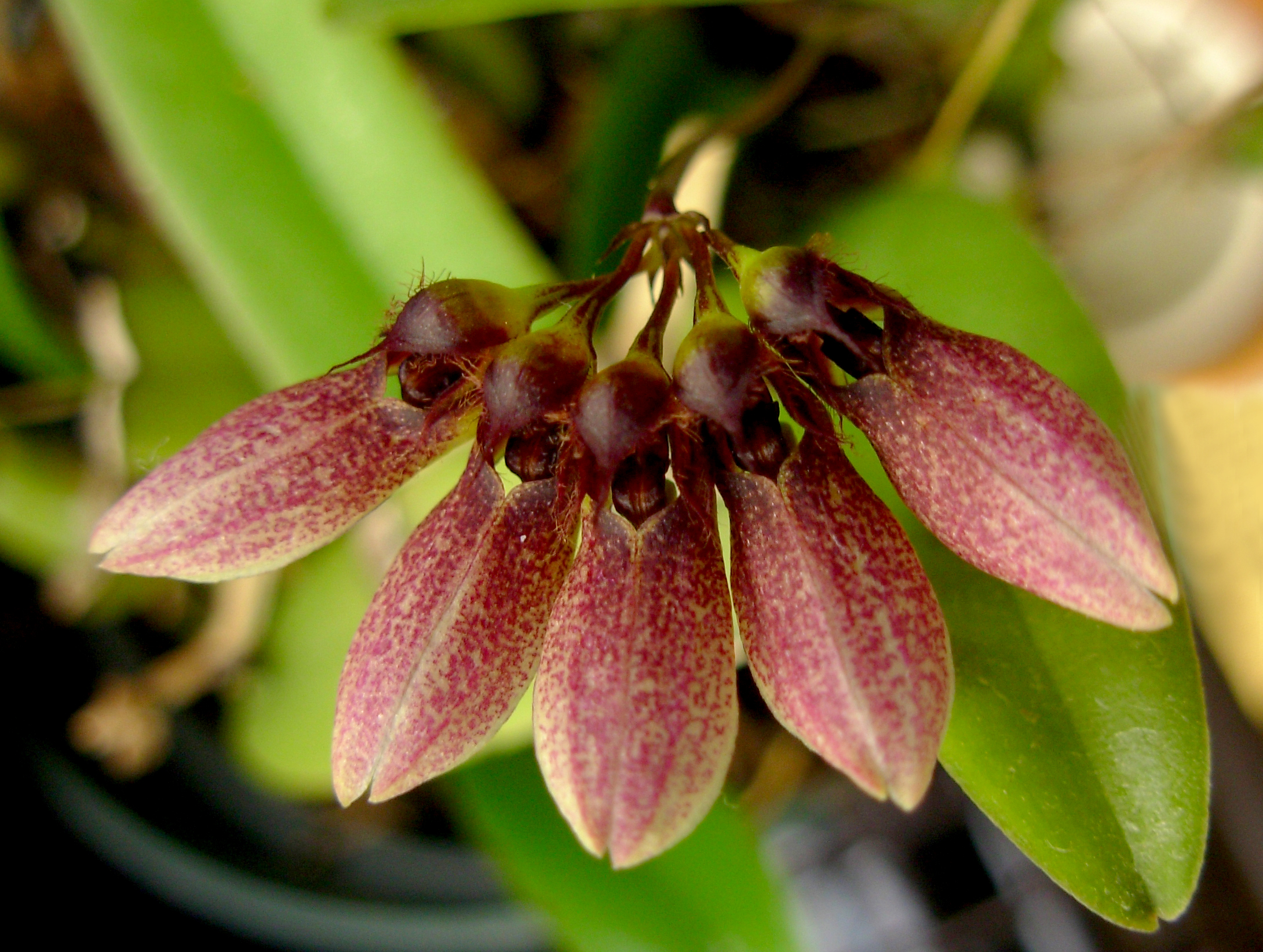

Scientific classification
- Kingdom: Plantae
- Clade: Tracheophytes
- Clade: Angiosperms
- Clade: Monocots
- Order: Asparagales
- Family: Orchidaceae
- Subfamily: Epidendroideae
- Tribe: Malaxideae
- Subtribe: Dendrobiinae
- Genus: Bulbophyllum
- Species: B. lepidum

Binomial name
- Bulbophyllum lepidum (Blume) J.J.Sm.

Synonyms
- Bulbophyllum flabelloveneris (J. Koenig) Seidenf. & Ormerod ex Aver.; Bulbophyllum gamosepalum (Griff.) J.J.Sm.; Bulbophyllum griffithianum E.C.Parish & Rchb.f. [Illegitimate]; Bulbophyllum flabellum-veneris (J.Koenig) Aver.; Bulbophyllum lepidum var. angustum Ridl.; Bulbophyllum lepidum var. insigne J.J.Sm.; Bulbophyllum rolfeanum (Rolfe ex Downie) Seidenf. & Smitinand; Bulbophyllum umbellatum J.J.Sm. [Illegitimate]; Bulbophyllum viscidum J.J.Sm.; Cirrhopetalum ciliatum Klinge; Cirrhopetalum flabellum-veneris (J.Koenig) Seidenf. & Ormerod; Cirrhopetalum gagnepainii Guillaumin; Cirrhopetalum gamosepalum Griff.; Cirrhopetalum lepidum (Blume) Schltr.; Cirrhopetalum siamense Rolfe ex Downie; Cirrhopetalum stramineum var. purpureum Gagnep.; Cirrhopetalum viscidum (J.J.Sm.) Garay, Hamer & Siegerist; Ephippium lepidum Blume; Epidendrum flabellum-veneris J.Koenig; Phyllorchis gamosepala (Griff.) Kuntze; Phyllorchis rolfei Kuntze; Phyllorkis gamosepala (Griff.) Kuntze.

= Bulbophyllum lepidum =

Species of orchid

Bulbophyllum lepidum, is a species of orchid, in the subfamily Epidendroideae and the genus Bulbophyllum, with the common name: Venus' fan bulbophyllum.

== Description ==
Epiphyte with a woody rhizome and 2 cm (0.79 in) separation between each of its five conical pseudobulbs, of a glossy pale green color, located at 5 unequal angles, each one of the which bears a single apical leaf, erect, oblong, short and obtusely bilobed apically, tapering sharply below to the short petiolate base of the leaf, which flowers in two to three basal inflorescence 15–22 cm (5.9–8.7 in) long, of bright purple with three acute and narrowly lanceolate, concave, reddish-brown tubular bracts bearing 11-13 flowers above the leaf forming an umbel.

This orchid greatly resembles the Bulbophyllum trigonopus. Its flowers cluster in groups of 7 to 10 in a fan like structure. They are mainly red but taper to yellow at the edges.

== Distribution ==
It is native to Hainan island, India, Indonesia, Myanmar, Laos, Cambodia, Malaysia, Thailand and Vietnam in deciduous and evergreen forests on mossy rocks and at the bases of trees at elevations from 300–1,100 m (980–3,610 ft).
