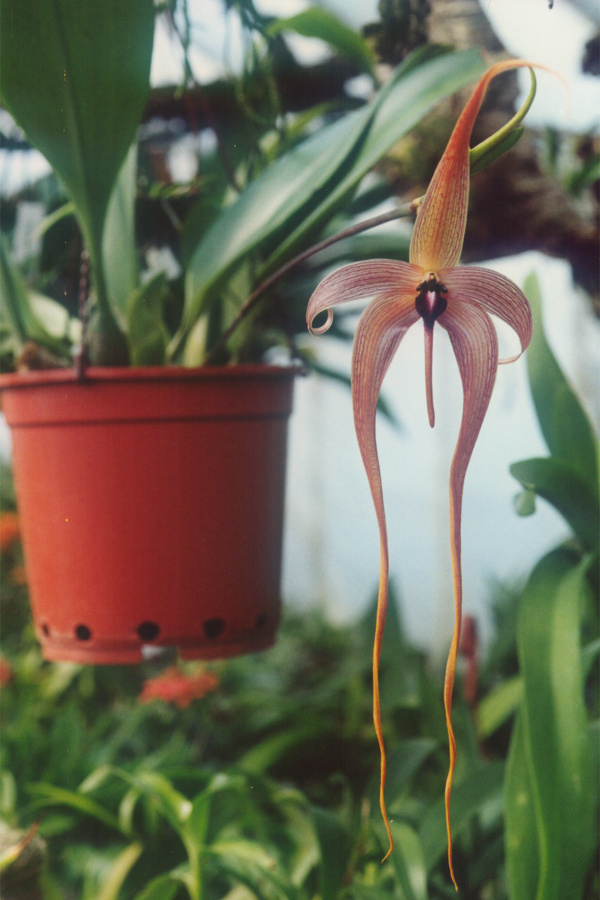

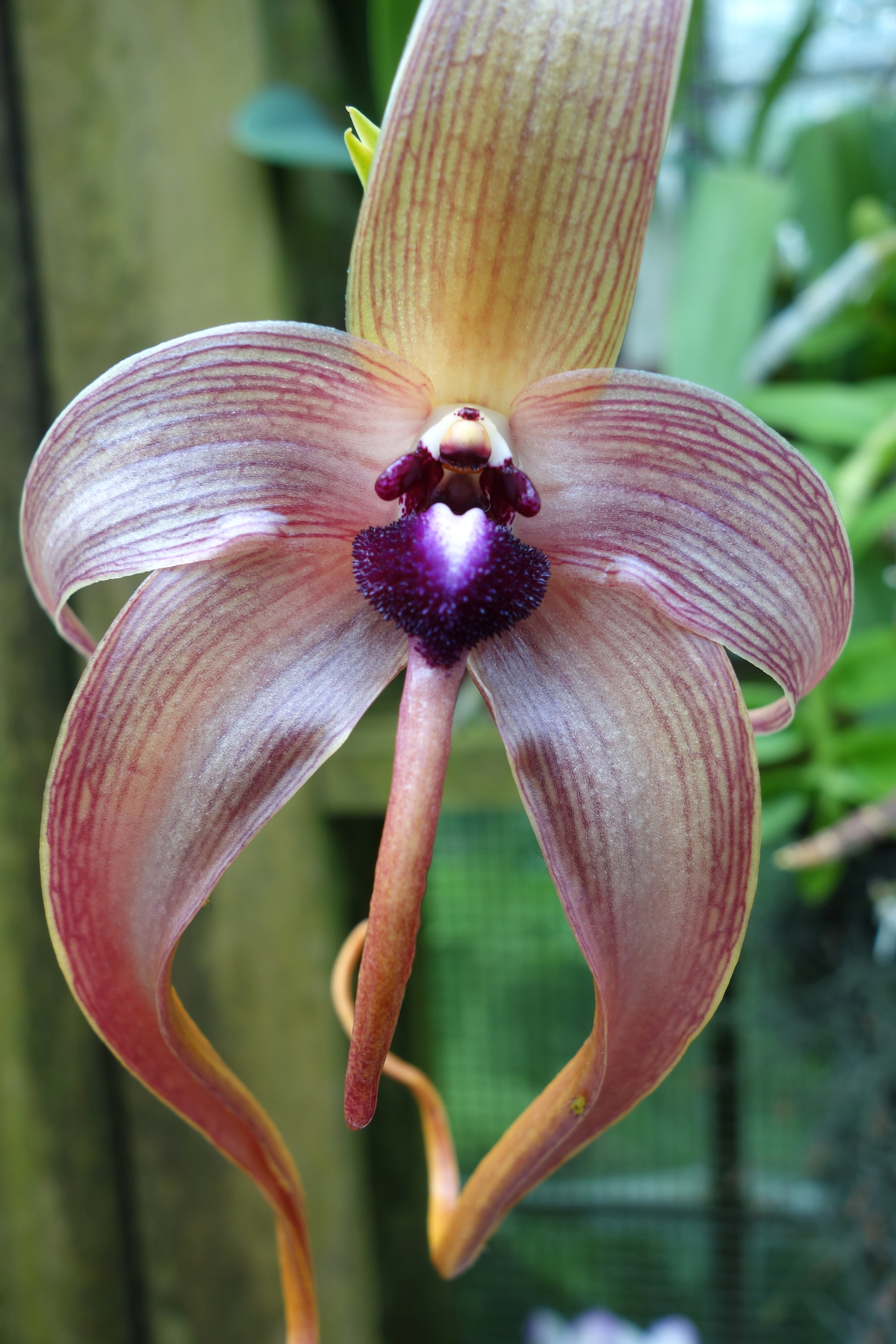

Conservation status
- CITES Appendix II

Scientific classification
- Kingdom: Plantae
- Clade: Embryophytes
- Clade: Tracheophytes
- Clade: Angiosperms
- Clade: Monocots
- Order: Asparagales
- Family: Orchidaceae
- Subfamily: Epidendroideae
- Genus: Bulbophyllum
- Species: B. echinolabium

Binomial name
- Bulbophyllum echinolabium J.J. Sm. (1934)

= Bulbophyllum echinolabium =

Hedgehog-shaped lip bulbophyllum

Species of orchid

Bulbophyllum echinolabium (hedgehog-shaped lip bulbophyllum) is a species of orchid.
