= Bulbophyllum santosii =

Scientific classification
- Kingdom: Plantae
- Clade: Tracheophytes
- Clade: Angiosperms
- Clade: Monocots
- Order: Asparagales
- Family: Orchidaceae
- Subfamily: Epidendroideae
- Genus: Bulbophyllum
- Species: B. santosii

Binomial name
- Bulbophyllum santosii Ames

Species of orchid

Bulbophyllum santosii is a species of orchid in the genus Bulbophyllum. It is endemic to the Philippines and is a epiphyte type plant.

== Habitat ==
- Blooming Season: Winter Blooming
- Light Requirements: Shade to Bright; 1500-2500 Foot-candles (indirect light, pronounced shadowing)
- Temperature: Intermediate to Warm; 58°F min. to 88°F max.
- Location: At 800m in the Philippines
