= Bulbophyllum carnosisepalum =

Scientific classification
- Kingdom: Plantae
- Clade: Tracheophytes
- Clade: Angiosperms
- Clade: Monocots
- Order: Asparagales
- Family: Orchidaceae
- Subfamily: Epidendroideae
- Genus: Bulbophyllum
- Species: B. carnosisepalum

Binomial name
- Bulbophyllum carnosisepalum J.J.Verm. 1986

Species of orchid

Bulbophyllum carnosisepalum is a species of orchid in the genus Bulbophyllum found in Ivory Coast, Cameroon, Gabon, Zaire and Uganda.
