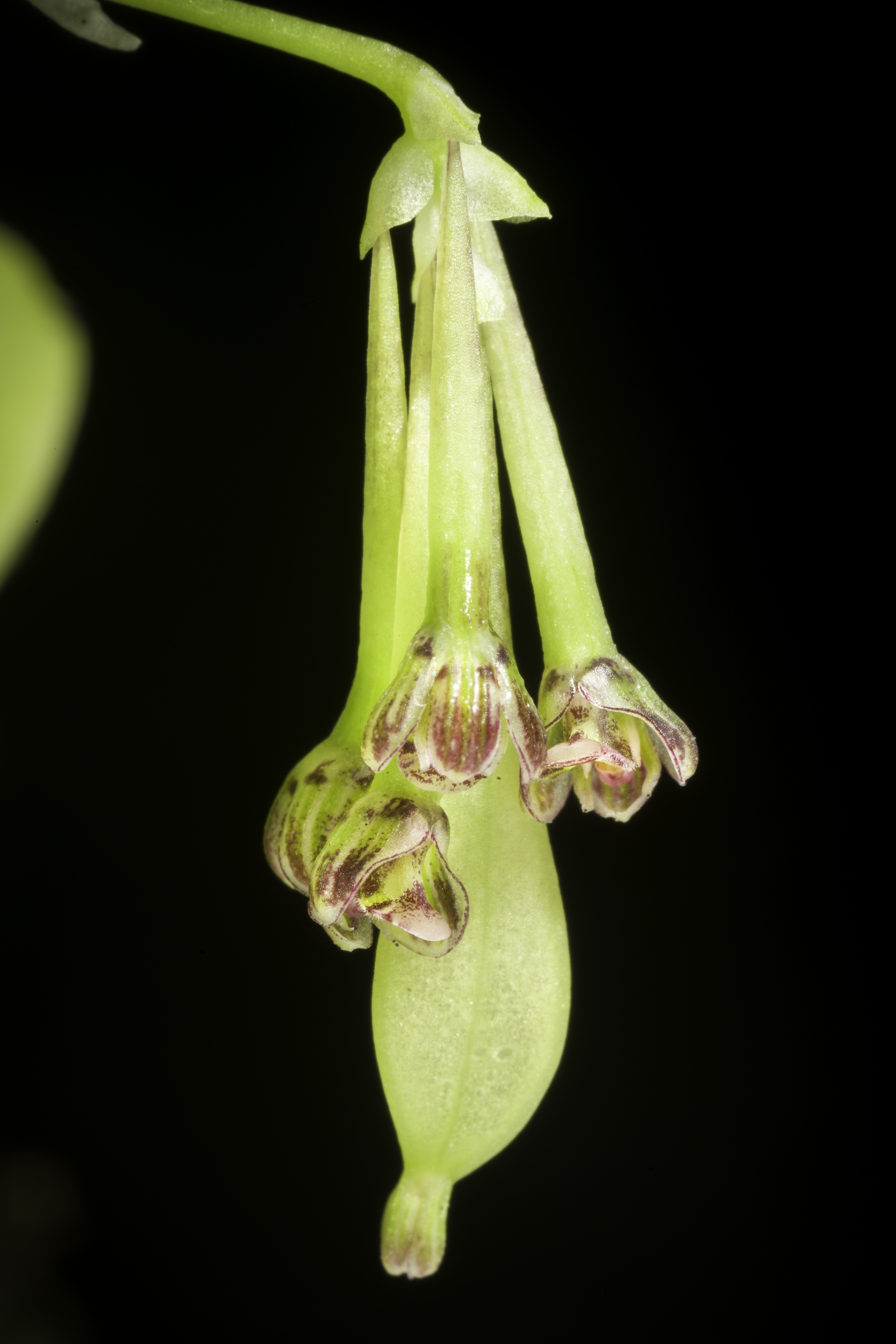

Scientific classification
- Kingdom: Plantae
- Clade: Tracheophytes
- Clade: Angiosperms
- Clade: Monocots
- Order: Asparagales
- Family: Orchidaceae
- Subfamily: Epidendroideae
- Genus: Bulbophyllum
- Species: B. physometrum

Binomial name
- Bulbophyllum physometrum J.J.Verm., Suksathan & Watthana 2017

= Bulbophyllum physometrum =

Species of orchid

Bulbophyllum physometrum is a species of epiphytic orchid in the genus Bulbophyllum from Thailand. It is the only species in Bulbophyllum section Physometra
