= Bulbophyllum nigericum =

Conservation status
- Vulnerable (IUCN 3.1)

Scientific classification
- Kingdom: Plantae
- Clade: Tracheophytes
- Clade: Angiosperms
- Clade: Monocots
- Order: Asparagales
- Family: Orchidaceae
- Subfamily: Epidendroideae
- Genus: Bulbophyllum
- Species: B. nigericum

Binomial name
- Bulbophyllum nigericum Summerh

Species of orchid

Bulbophyllum nigericum is an epiphytic or epilithic plant species in the family Orchidaceae. It is native to Cameroon (Enyandong, Mt Kupe and the Bakossi Mountains), and Nigeria, where it is found growing habitually in submontane and montane, tropical or subtropical, moist forest, at elevations roughly between 800 and 2,050 meters. It is threatened by habitat loss due to continued, extensive forest clearance for the purpose of crop cultivation. It was described in 1962.

In the village of Enyandong, a specimen of B. nigericum is growing on a tree in front of the house of the village Chief, where it is visible to the public. Conservationists are hopeful that this will help raise local awareness of this plant, aid in its identification, and so promote its protection.
