= Bulbophyllum pandanetorum =

Conservation status
- Endangered (IUCN 3.1)

Scientific classification
- Kingdom: Plantae
- Clade: Tracheophytes
- Clade: Angiosperms
- Clade: Monocots
- Order: Asparagales
- Family: Orchidaceae
- Subfamily: Epidendroideae
- Genus: Bulbophyllum
- Species: B. pandanetorum

Binomial name
- Bulbophyllum pandanetorum Summerh.

Species of orchid

Bulbophyllum pandanetorum is a rare species of epiphytic plant in the family Orchidaceae. It is found in Cameroon and Gabon, where its natural habitat is subtropical or tropical moist lowland forests at elevations roughly between 200 and 950 meters. It is threatened by habitat loss. It was botanically described in 1954.

In September 1925, the first sample of B. pandanetorum were collected, twice, in Gabon. They were both found in the Ngounie River region; the first specimen was located near Kembélé, and the second, along the River Dévèla. Both were attached to Pandanus trees, and so the botanist's choice of specific epithet.

Since then, it has never been collected again from anywhere in that country, and in spite of meticulous, if sporadic botanical surveyance in many parts of the south and west of Cameroon, B. pandanetorum had never been among the plants collected in that country either.

In June 1996, however, it was for the first time found outside of Gabon, growing on the submontane slopes of Mt. Kupe, in Cameroon. Here it must be supposed, it undergoes continuing decline due to habitat loss through the encroachment of farms, which are known to be spreading. The Gabonian habitat's course of endangerment to B. pandanetorum, and its level of seriousness are yet to be determined.
