= Bulbophyllum resupinatum =

Scientific classification
- Kingdom: Plantae
- Clade: Tracheophytes
- Clade: Angiosperms
- Clade: Monocots
- Order: Asparagales
- Family: Orchidaceae
- Subfamily: Epidendroideae
- Genus: Bulbophyllum
- Species: B. resupinatum

Binomial name
- Bulbophyllum resupinatum Ridl. 1887

Synonyms
- Bulbophyllum filiforme Kraenzl. 1895; Bulbophyllum daloaense P.J.Cribb & Pérez-Vera 1975; Bulbophyllum longispicatum Kraenzl. & Schltr. 1908; Bulbophyllum macrostachyum Kraenzl. 1908; Bulbophyllum rubroviolaceum De Wild. 1921; Bulbophyllum victoris P.J.Cribb & Pérez-Vera 1975

Species of orchid

Bulbophyllum resupinatum is a species of epiphytic plant in the genus Bulbophyllum.

== Subspecies ==
Two subspecies are recognized:

Image	Scientific name	Distribution
	Bulbophyllum resupinatum var. resupinatum	Cameroon, Gabon, Ghana, Gulf of Guinea Is., Ivory Coast, Nigeria, Zaïre
	Bulbophyllum resupinatum var. filiforme (Kraenzl.) J.J.Verm. 1986	Cameroon and Nigeria, where its natural habitat is subtropical or tropical dry, lowland evergreen forests.
