= Bulbophyllum dichotomum =

Scientific classification
- Kingdom: Plantae
- Clade: Tracheophytes
- Clade: Angiosperms
- Clade: Monocots
- Order: Asparagales
- Family: Orchidaceae
- Subfamily: Epidendroideae
- Genus: Bulbophyllum
- Species: B. dichotomum

Binomial name
- Bulbophyllum dichotomum J.J.Sm.

Species of orchid

Bulbophyllum dichotomum is a species of orchid in the genus Bulbophyllum found in New Guinea, Solomons Islands and Vanuatu.
