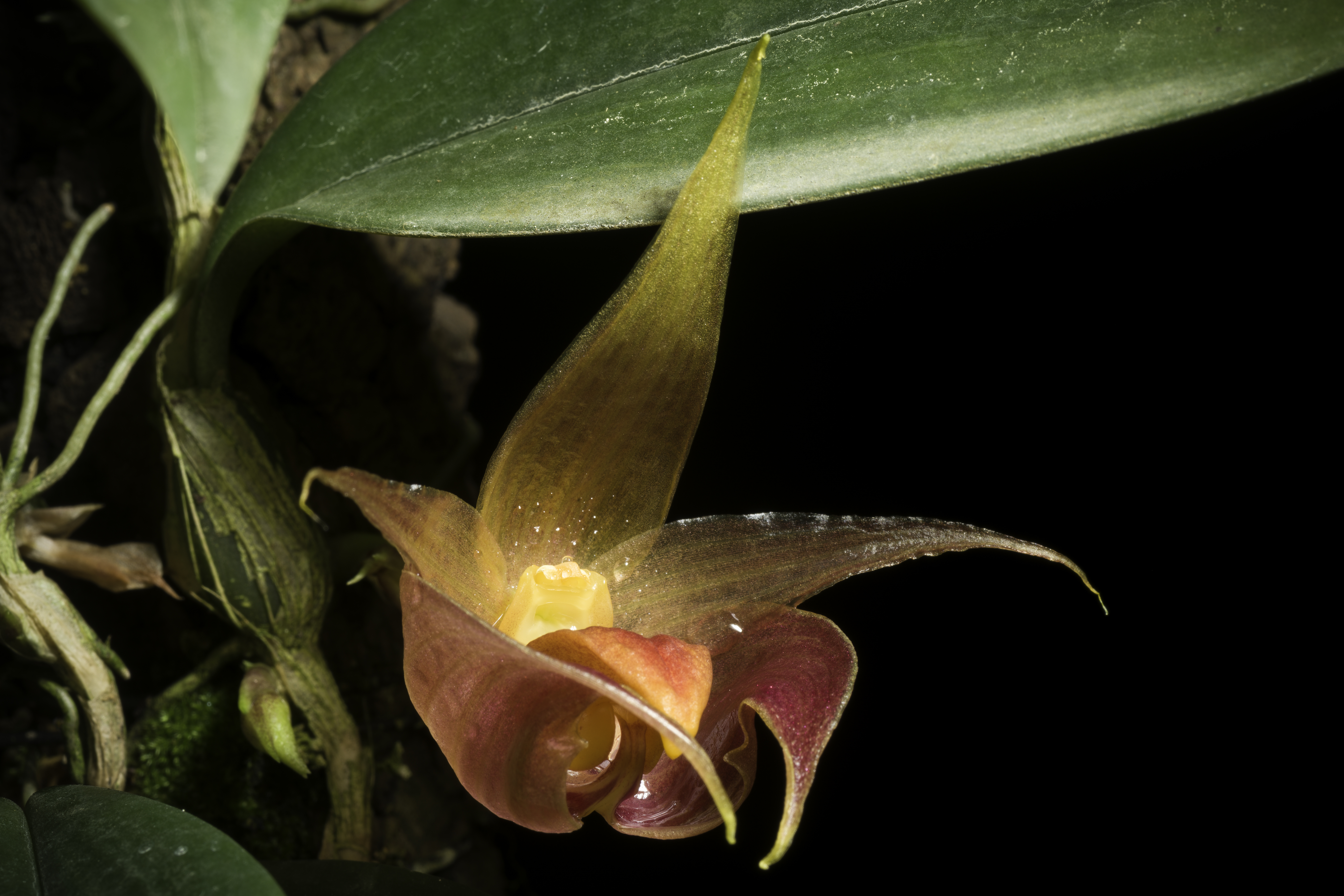
- Flower

Scientific classification
- Kingdom: Plantae
- Clade: Tracheophytes
- Clade: Angiosperms
- Clade: Monocots
- Order: Asparagales
- Family: Orchidaceae
- Subfamily: Epidendroideae
- Genus: Bulbophyllum
- Species: B. translucidum

Binomial name
- Bulbophyllum translucidum R.Bustam., Kindler & U.F.Ferreras 2016

= Bulbophyllum translucidum =

Species of orchid

Bulbophyllum translucidum is a species of orchid in the genus Bulbophyllum.

It is named after the translucent nature of the tepals. It is placed in section Sestochilus. Flowers have a fecal scent attracting flies from the family Muscidae that pollinate the flower.

== Distribution ==
The plant is endemic to Samar, Leyte and Agusan, Philippines growing on limestone outcrops in the forest at 321 meters.
