= Bulbophyllum ikongoense =

Scientific classification
- Kingdom: Plantae
- Clade: Tracheophytes
- Clade: Angiosperms
- Clade: Monocots
- Order: Asparagales
- Family: Orchidaceae
- Subfamily: Epidendroideae
- Genus: Bulbophyllum
- Species: B. ikongoense

Binomial name
- Bulbophyllum ikongoense H. Perrier

Species of orchid

Bulbophyllum ikongoense is a species of orchid in the genus Bulbophyllum.

== Distribution ==
Plants are found in the central plateau of Madagascar growing in montane forest at elevations of 1000 to 1400 meters.
