= Bulbophyllum bifarium =

Two-sided bulbophyllum

Conservation status
- Vulnerable (IUCN 3.1)

Scientific classification
- Kingdom: Plantae
- Clade: Tracheophytes
- Clade: Angiosperms
- Clade: Monocots
- Order: Asparagales
- Family: Orchidaceae
- Subfamily: Epidendroideae
- Genus: Bulbophyllum
- Species: B. bifarium

Binomial name
- Bulbophyllum bifarium Hook.f.

Synonyms
- Bulbophyllum pallescens Kraenzl. Phyllorchis bifaria (Lindl.) Kuntze

Species of orchid from Cameroon

Bulbophyllum bifarium, or two-sided bulbophyllum, is an epiphytic (occasionally lithophytic) plant species in the family Orchidaceae, flowering in November and endemic to Cameroon. Its natural habitats are subtropical or tropical moist lowland forests and subtropical or tropical moist montane forests, where it is threatened by habitat loss. It was described in 1864 by Joseph Dalton Hooker.

== Range and habitat ==
B. bifarium is found exclusively in the submontane and montane forests of Cameroon, at elevations between 800 and 1,800 meters, where it occupies a land area in excess of 2,000 square km. Sites where B. bifarium specimens have been collected include: along the Douala to Bimbia road; Mfongu near Bagangu; Bana-Bateha near Fibé; Nkokom Massif near Ndom; Nyasoso on Mount Kupe; Kodmin in the Bakossi Mountains; and on Mount Cameroon.

It is likely that B. bifarium is already extinct in many of the lower-elevation areas within its traditional range. This is mainly blamed on encroaching small-holder farm and plantation ventures, which clear the forestlands where the species lives. Habitats at the higher elevations, such as at Kodmin, tentatively afford some measure of protection from these harms, and support a more thriving population.
