= Pseudobulb =

Storage organ found in certain plants

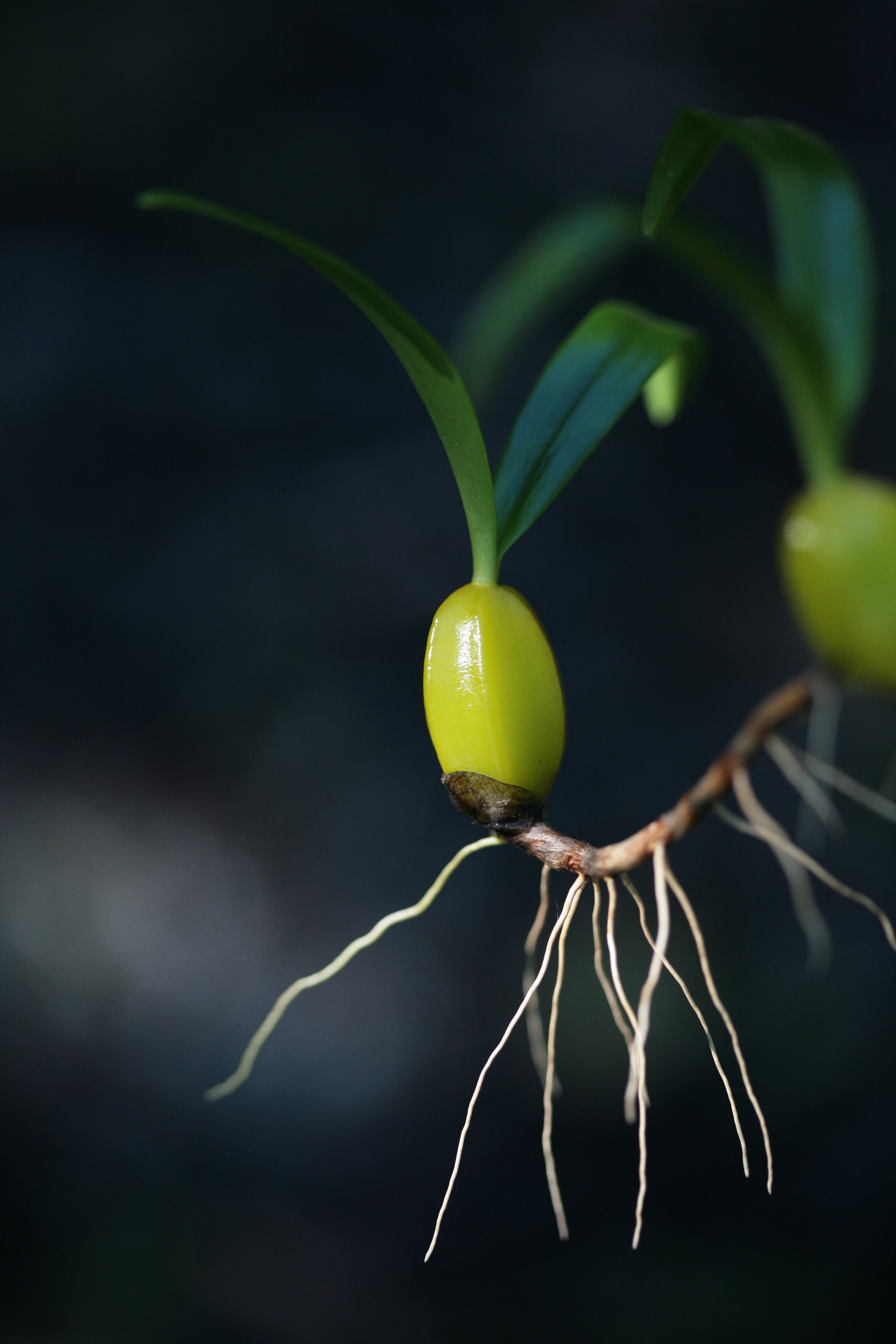
Heteroblastic pseudobulb of Bulbophyllum nutans composed of a single internode

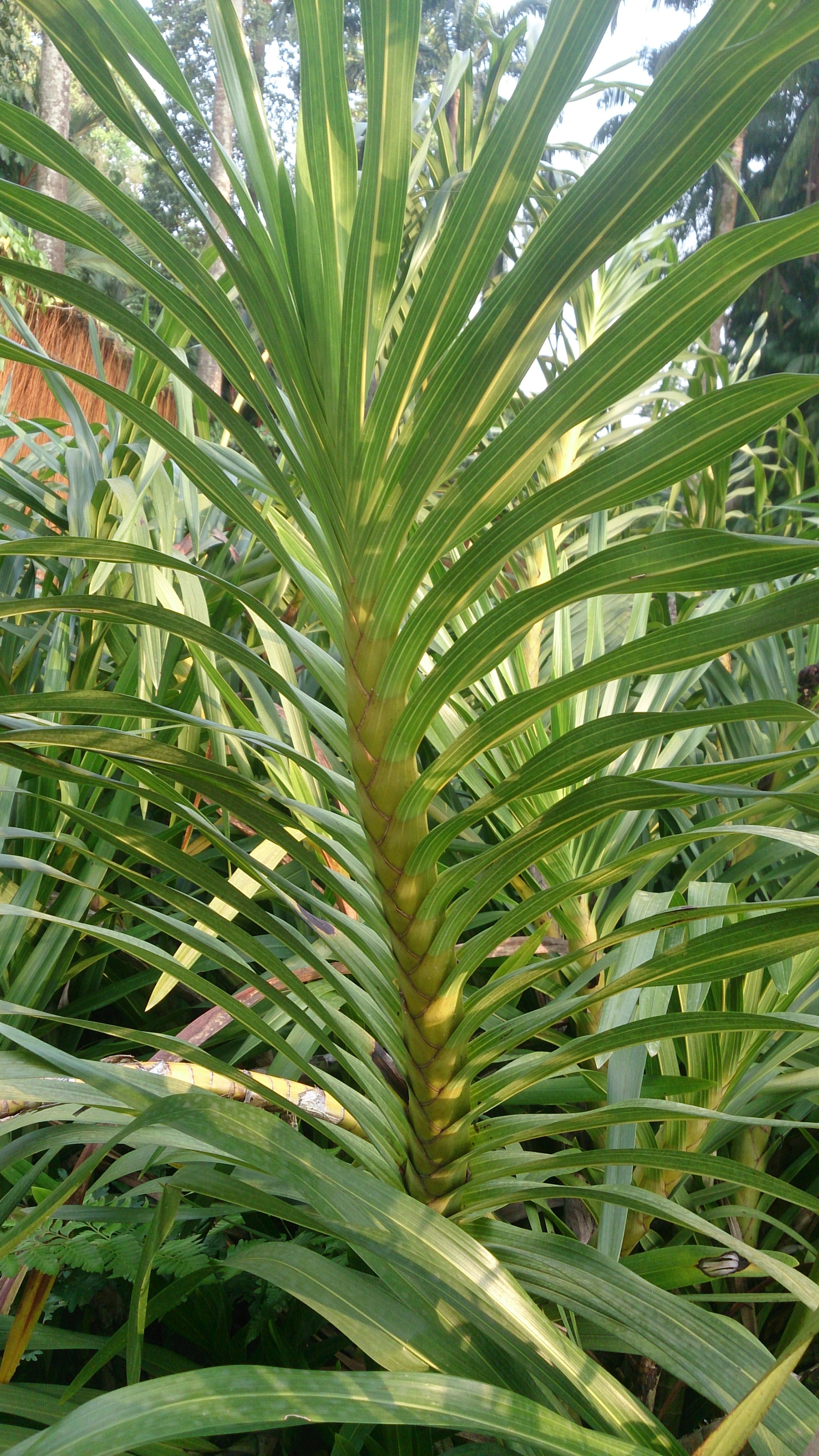
Cane-like homoblastic pseudobulb of Grammatophyllum speciosum with many internodes and leaves that persist

In botany, a pseudobulb is a storage organ found in many epiphytic and terrestrial sympodial orchids. It is derived from a thickening of the part of a stem between leaf nodes and may be composed of just one internode or several, termed heteroblastic and homoblastic respectively. All leaves and inflorescences usually arise from this structure. Pseudobulbs formed from a single internode produce the leaves and inflorescence from the top, while those that are formed from several internodes can possess leaves along its length. The modified sheath leaves that appear at the base of a pseudobulb and often enfold all or part of it are usually dry and papery, though in some orchids the sheaths bear leaf blades and the leaves at the pseudobulb's apex are reduced to scales.

In some species, it is hardly swollen at all and looks like a normal stem with many leaves, while at the other extreme some genera such as Bulbophyllum have single, spherical pseudobulbs with one (or two) leaves at the apex of each. Whether cane-like (with many joints) or spherical (with one or few joints), they are all produced from a long-lived creeping stem called a rhizome which may itself be climbing or pendulous. The pseudobulbs are relatively short lived (1–5 years), but are continually produced from the growing tip of the rhizome and may persist for years after its last leaves senesce.

The term pseudobulb is used to distinguish the above-ground storage organ from other storage organs derived from stems that were underground, namely corms or true bulbs, a combination of an underground stem and storage leaves. Strictly speaking, there is no clear distinction between the pseudobulb and corm structures.
