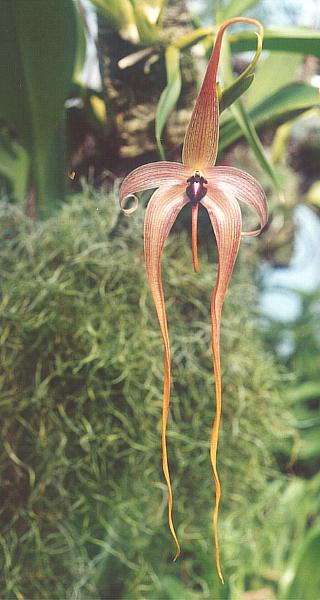
- Bulbophyllum echinolabium

Scientific classification
- Kingdom: Plantae
- Clade: Tracheophytes
- Clade: Angiosperms
- Clade: Monocots
- Order: Asparagales
- Family: Orchidaceae
- Subfamily: Epidendroideae
- Subtribe: Dendrobiinae
- Genus: Bulbophyllum; Thouars, 1822

Type species
- Bulbophyllum nutans

Species
- See List of Bulbophyllum species

Diversity
- 2167 species

Synonyms
- List of synonyms: Acrochaene Lindl.; Adelopetalum Fitzg.; Anisopetalon Hook.; Blepharochilum M.A.Clem. & D.L.Jones; Bolbophyllaria Rchb.f.; Bolbophyllopsis Rchb.f.; Bolbophyllum Spreng.; Bulbophyllaria S.Moore; Canacorchis Guillaumin; Carparomorchis M.A.Clem. & D.L.Jones; Chaseella Summerh.; Cirrhopetalum Lindl.; × Cirrhophyllum Anon.; Cochlia Blume; Codonosiphon Schltr.; Dactylorhynchus Schltr.; Didactyle Lindl.; Diphyes Blume; Drymoda Lindl.; Ephippium Blume; Epicranthes Blume; Epicrianthes Blume; Ferruminaria Garay, Hamer & Siegerist; Fruticicola (Schltr.) M.A.Clem. & D.L.Jones; Genyorchis Schltr.; Hamularia Aver. & Averyanova; Hapalochilus (Schltr.) Senghas; Henosis Hook.f.; Hippoglossum Breda; Hordeanthos Szlach.; Hyalosema Rolfe; Ichthyostomum D.L.Jones, M.A.Clem. & Molloy; Ione Lindl.; Jejosephia A.N.Rao & Mani; Katherinea A.D.Hawkes; Kaurorchis D.L.Jones & M.A.Clem.; Lepanthanthe (Schltr.) Szlach.; Lyraea Lindl.; Macrolepis A.Rich.; Malachadenia Lindl.; Mastigion Garay, Hamer & Siegerist; Megaclinium Lindl.; Monomeria Lindl.; Monosepalum Schltr.; Odontostylis Blume; Odontostylis Breda; Oncophyllum D.L.Jones & M.A.Clem.; Osyricera Blume; Oxysepala Wight; Pachyrhachis A.Rich.; Papulipetalum (Schltr.) M.A.Clem. & D.L.Jones; Pedilochilus Schltr.; Pelma Finet; Peltopus (Schltr.) Szlach. & Marg.; Phyllorkis Thouars; Rhytionanthos Garay, Hamer & Siegerist; Saccoglossum Schltr.; Sarcobodium Beer; Sarcopodium Lindl. & Paxton; Serpenticaulis M.A.Clem. & D.L.Jones; Sestochilos Breda; Spilorchis D.L.Jones & M.A.Clem.; Sunipia Lindl.; Synarmosepalum Garay, Hamer & Siegerist; Tapeinoglossum Schltr.; Taurostalix Rchb.f.; Trachyrhachis (Schltr.) Szlach.; Trias Lindl.; Tribrachia Lindl.; Tripudianthes (Seidenf.) Szlach. & Kras; Vesicisepalum (J.J.Sm.) Garay, Hamer & Siegerist; Xiphizusa Rchb.f.; Zygoglossum Reinw.

= Bulbophyllum =

Genus of orchids

Bulbophyllum is a genus of mostly epiphytic and lithophytic orchids in the family Orchidaceae. It is the largest genus in the orchid family and one of the largest genera of flowering plants with more than 2,000 species, exceeded in number only by Astragalus. These orchids are found in diverse habitats throughout most of the warmer parts of the world including Africa, southern Asia, Latin America, the West Indies, and various islands in the Indian and Pacific Oceans. Orchids in this genus have thread-like or fibrous roots that creep over the surface of trees or rocks or hang from branches. The stem is divided into a rhizome and a pseudobulb, a feature that distinguished this genus from Dendrobium. There is usually only a single leaf at the top of the pseudobulb and from one to many flowers are arranged along an unbranched flowering stem that arises from the base of the pseudobulb. Several attempts have been made to separate Bulbophyllum into smaller genera, but most have not been accepted by the World Checklist of Selected Plant Families.

== Description ==
Plants in the genus Bulbophyllum are epiphytic or lithophytic sympodial herbs with thread-like or fibrous roots that creep over the surface on which they grow. The stem consists of a rhizome and a pseudobulb, the latter with one or two usually fleshy or leathery leaves. The flowers are arranged on an unbranched raceme that emerges from the pseudobulb, usually from its base. The dorsal sepal is free from the lateral sepals which themselves may be free or fused to each other. The petals are also free from each other and smaller than the lateral sepals. The labellum is often fleshy, curved and hinged to the base of the column.

== Distribution and habitat ==
The center of diversity of this genus is in the montane forests of Papua New Guinea (more than 600 species) which seems to be the evolutionary homeland, though the genus is pantropical and widespread, occurring in Australia, Southeast Asia (with over 200 species in Borneo), India, Madagascar (with 135 species, some endemic), Africa and in tropical central and South America.

The erect to pendent inflorescence arises laterally from the base of the pseudobulb. The flower form has a basic structural blueprint that serves to identify this genus. But this form can be very diverse: compound or single, with few to many flowers, with the resupinate flowers arranged spirally or in two vertical ranks. The sepals and the petals can also be very varied : straight or turned down, without footstalk or with a long claw at the base. They are often hairy or callous. There are two to four hard and waxy pollinia with stipes present or absent. The fruits are beakless capsules.

== Taxonomy and naming ==
The genus Bulbophyllum was first formally described in 1822 by Louis-Marie Aubert du Petit-Thouars in his book Histoire particulière des plantes orchidées recueillies sur les trois Iles Australes d'Afrique, de France, de Bourbon et de Madagascar in which he described eighteen species of Bulbophyllum.

There are now more than 2,800 records (accepted names and synonyms) for this genus. This large number and the great variety of its forms make the genus a considerable challenge for taxonomists: 120 sections and subgenera have been listed.

The genus name (Bulbophyllum) is derived from the Greek bolbos meaning 'bulb' and phyllon, 'a leaf', referring to the pseudobulbs on top of which the leaf grows.

In 2014, Alec Pridgeon and others proposed merging the genus Drymoda with Bulbophyllum in the Genera Orchidacearum and the change is accepted by Plants of the World Online and the World Checklist of Selected Plant Families. The former species of Drymoda included D. digitata (now B. digitatum), D. gymnopus (now B. gymnopus), D. latisepala (now B. capillipes), D. picta (the type species of Drymoda, now B. drymoda), and D. siamensis (now B. ayuthayense).

=== Evolution and biogeography ===
Molecular phylogenetic studies place the origin of the orchid genus Bulbophyllum into the early Miocene. Biogeographic analyses and ancestral area reconstructions identified the Asia-Pacific region as the ancestral area of Bulbophyllum and suggest an early-to-late Miocene scenario of 'out-of-Asia-Pacific' origin and progressive (east-to-west) dispersal-mediated diversification, resulting in three additional radiations in Madagascar, Africa and the Neotropics, respectively.

=== Sections ===
In 2019 Bulbophyllum were separated into four clades Neotropics, Africa, Madagascar, and the Asia-Pacific.

==== Africa Clade ====
Image	Section	Type species
	Bifarium	Bulbophyllum bifarium
	Carnosisepala	Bulbophyllum carnosisepalum
	Chaseela	Bulbophyllum pseudohydra
	Comata	Bulbophyllum comatum
	Denticulata	Bulbophyllum denticulatum
	Genyorchis	Bulbophyllum apetalum
	Gilgiana	Bulbophyllum gilgianum
	Megaclinium	Bulbophyllum falcatum
	Ptiloglossum	Bulbophyllum barbigerum
	Oreonastes	Bulbophyllum oreonastes

==== Madagascar Clade ====
Image	Section	Type species
	Alcistachys	Bulbophyllum occlusum
	Bifalcula	Bulbophyllum implexum
	Bulbophyllum	Bulbophyllum nutans
	Elasmotopus	Bulbophyllum oxycalyx
	Ikongoense	Bulbophyllum ikongoense
	Inversiflora	Bulbophyllum cardiobulbum
	Kinethrix	Bulbophyllum mirificum
	Lichenophylax	Bulbophyllum lichenophylax
	Lupulina	Bulbophyllum occultum
	Lyperocephalum	Bulbophyllum lyperocephalum
	Moratii	Bulbophyllum moratii
	Pachychlamys	Bulbophyllum pachypus
	Pantoblepharon	Bulbophyllum pantoblepharon
	Ploiarium	Bulbophyllum coriophorum
	Polyradices	Bulbophyllum petrae

==== Neotropical Clade ====
Image	Section	Type species
	Bulbophyllaria	Bulbophyllum bracteolatum
	Didactyle	Bulbophyllum exaltatum
	Furvescentia	Bulbophyllum nagelii
	Micranthae	Bulbophyllum micranthum
	Napelli	Bulbophyllum napellii
	Xiphizusa	Bulbophyllum chloropterum

==== Asia-Pacific Clade ====
Image	Section	Type species
	Acrochaene	Bulbophyllum kingii
	Adelopetalum	Bulbophyllum bracteatum
	Aeschynanthoides	Bulbophyllum dryas
	Altisceptrum	Bulbophyllum elongatum
	Antennata	Bulbophyllum fuscopurpureum
	Balaenoidea	Bulbophyllum balaeniceps
	Beccariana	Bulbophyllum beccarii
	Biflorae	Bulbophyllum biflorum
	Biseta	Bulbophyllum bisetum
	Blepharistes	Bulbophyllum blepharistes
	Brachyantha	Bulbophyllum umbellatum
	Brachystachyae	Bulbophyllum repens
	Brachypus	Bulbophyllum maxillarioides
	Cirrhopetaloides	Bulbophyllum longissimum
	Cirrhopetalum	Bulbophyllum longiflorum
	Codonosiphon	Bulbophyllum codonanthum
	Codonosiphon	Bulbophyllum raulersoniae
	Desmosanthes	Bulbophyllum croceum
	Drymoda	Bulbophyllum drymoda
	Epicranthes	Bulbophyllum epicranthes
	Ephippium	Bulbophyllum lepidum
	Eublepharon	Bulbophyllum eublepharon
	Gongorodes	Bulbophyllum digitatum
	Hemisterantha	Bulbophyllum hemisterranthum
	Hirtula	Bulbophyllum hirtulum
	Hoplandra	Bulbophyllum restrepia
	Hyalosema	Bulbophyllum grandiflorum
	Hymenobractea	Bulbophyllum infundibuliforme
	Intervallatae	Bulbophyllum attenuatum
	Imitatores	Bulbophyllum imitator
	Ione	Bulbophyllum roseopictum
	Lemniscata	Bulbophyllum lemniscatum
	Leopardinae	Bulbophyllum leopardinum
	Lepanthanthe	Bulbophyllum lepanthiflorum
	Lepidorhiza	Bulbophyllum amplebracteatum
	Macrocaulia	Bulbophyllum ovalifolium
	Macrouris	Bulbophyllum macrourum
	Minutissima	Bulbophyllum minutissimum
	Monanthaparva	Bulbophyllum striatellum
	Monanthes	Bulbophyllum tortuosum
	Monomeria	Bulbophyllum crabro
	Monosepalum	Bulbophyllum muricatum
	Oxysepala	Bulbophyllum clandestinum
	Papulipetalum	Bulbophyllum papulipetalum
	Pedilochilus	Bulbophyllum papuanum
	Pelma	Bulbophyllum absconditum
	Peltopus	Bulbophyllum peltopus
	Phreatiopsis	Bulbophyllum phreatiopse
	Physometra	Bulbophyllum physometrum
	Planibulbus	Bulbophyllum planibulbe
	Piestobulbon	Bulbophyllum piestobulbon
	Plumata	Bulbophyllum plumatum
	Polymeres	Bulbophyllum tenuifolium
	Pseudopelma	Bulbophyllum pseudopelma
	Racemosae	Bulbophyllum careyanum
	Rhinanthera	Bulbophyllum wrayi
	Saurocephalum	Bulbophyllum saurocephalum
	Schistopetalum	Bulbophyllum schistopetalum
	Serpenticaulis	Bulbophyllum wolfei
	Sestochilos	Bulbophyllum lobbii
	Stachysanthes	Bulbophyllum gibbosum
	Tapeinoglossum	Bulbophyllum centrosemiflorum
	Trias	Bulbophyllum oblongum
	Tripudianthes	Bulbophyllum tripudians
	Uncifera	Bulbophyllum ochroleucum

== Ecology ==
=== Pollination ===
Many Bulbophyllum species have the typical odor of rotting carcasses, and the flies they attract assist in their reproduction through pollination. Nevertheless, some species with mild and pleasant floral fragrance attract Dacini fruit flies (particularly Bactrocera and Zeugodacus species) via methyl eugenol, raspberry ketone or zingerone that also act as floral reward during pollination.

To facilitate pollinarium removal and pollinia deposition, this group of orchids, particularly those that attract Dacini fruit flies, possesses a highly modified dynamic lip mechanism - either hinged or see-saw or spring lip (kept either in a close- or open-position depending on resupinate or non-resupinate flower, respectively). When an attracted fly has aligned itself to the opened lip, further probing, feeding and movement towards the lip base result in the lip to snap close, thereby, forcibly tipping the fly in to the column cavity to initiate pollinarium removal or pollinia deposition.

== Use in horticulture ==
Bulbophyllum (abbreviated Bulb. in the horticultural trade) includes species that have been the focus of orchid collectors for over a century. The plants require high humidity combined with good air movement and most of them are ever-blooming - flowering continuously throughout the year. They grow best at moderate light levels, but do not thrive in deep shade. They are considered moderate-to-difficult to cultivate, and require a controlled growing environment to achieve some degree of success. They are not typically suitable as houseplants, and most will not thrive in a Wardian case unless they receive adequate air movement.

The plants' growth habit produces widely spaced pseudobulbs along cord-like rhizome sections, and most of these plants are best accommodated on plaques. Some species in this genus can get very large, but most are small to medium-sized epiphytes from warm, moist, humid tropical forests. They can grow continuously year round with no apparent dormancy period if they are kept warm, are moderate feeders in cultivation, and must be kept moist all the time. They can tolerate dryness for short periods, but they have fine root systems which require moist conditions all the time.

Some of the smaller species do well in pots with small-diameter bark substrate. The plants produce very fine roots generally, and the roots are easily damaged. The plants react poorly to disturbance of their roots. They are easy to maintain once a good environment is established with high humidity and a fresh, buoyant, lightly circulating atmosphere being critical. Most of these species cannot tolerate cold temperatures or freezing.

The flowers produce various odors resembling sap, urine, blood, dung, carrion, and, in some species, fragrant fruity aromas. Most are fly-pollinated, and attract hordes of flies. Bulbophyllum beccarii in bloom has been likened to smelling like a herd of dead elephants and both this species and Bulbophyllum fletcherianum are variously described as making it difficult to walk into a greenhouse in which they are being cultivated if the plants are in bloom because of their overpowering floral odors.

=== Species ===
Some species are known for their extreme vegetative and floral forms:

- Bulbophyllum beccarii
- Bulbophyllum barbigerum
- Bulbophyllum falcatum
- Bulbophyllum minutissimum
- Bulbophyllum santosii
- Bulbophyllum macphersonii
- Bulbophyllum medusae

== Conservation status ==
Some Bulbophyllum species are threatened with extinction, and are recognised as such by the World Conservation Union (IUCN):

- Bulbophyllum bifarium (vulnerable)
- Bulbophyllum filiforme (critically endangered)
- Bulbophyllum gravidum (vulnerable)
- Bulbophyllum jaapii (vulnerable)
- Bulbophyllum kupense (critically endangered)
- Bulbophyllum modicum (endangered)
- Bulbophyllum nigericum (vulnerable)
- Bulbophyllum pandanetorum (endangered)
- Bulbophyllum rubrolabellum (endangered)
- Bulbophyllum tokioi (endangered)

== Gallery ==
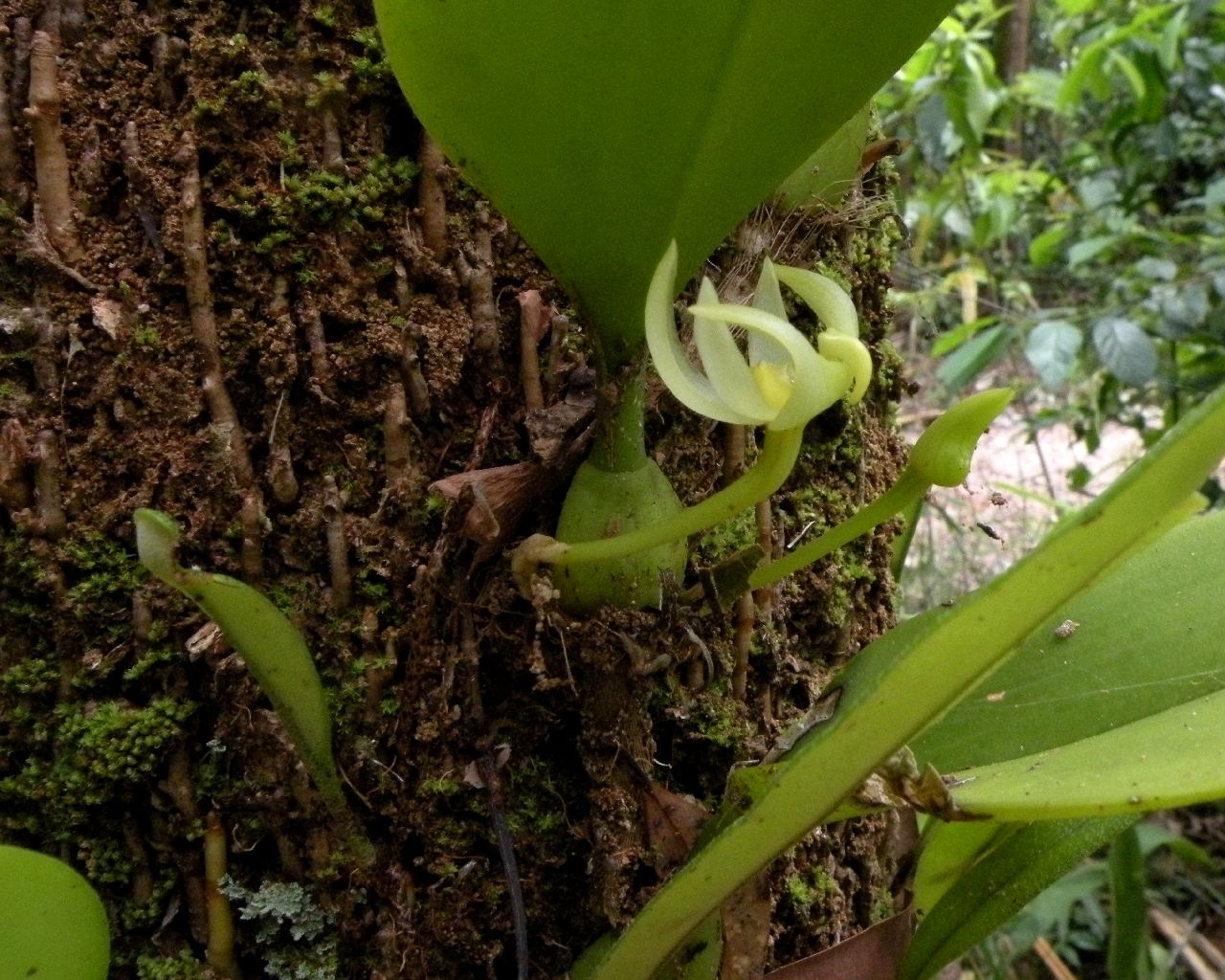
B. baileyi var. alba

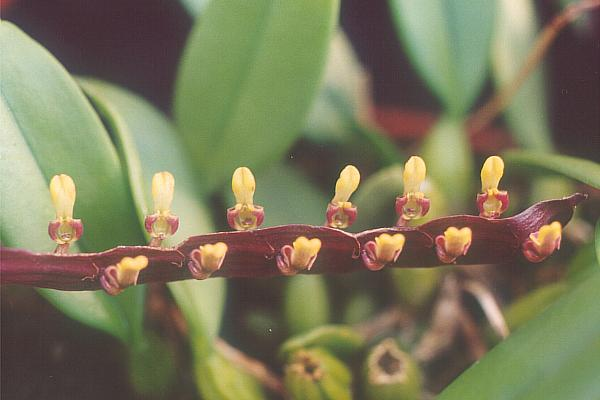
B. falcatum

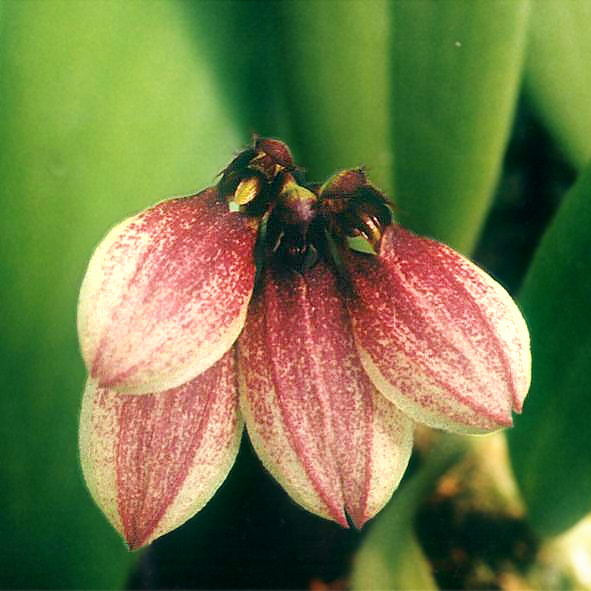
B. flabellum-veneris

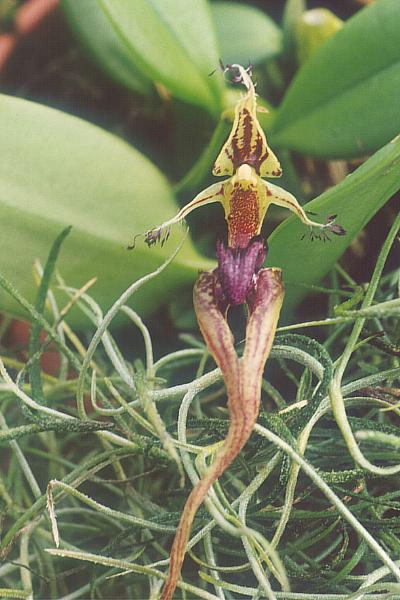
B. putidum

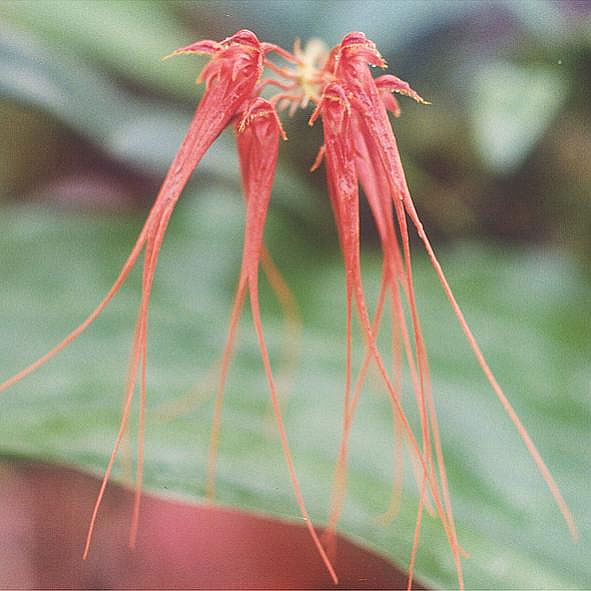
B. pectenveneris

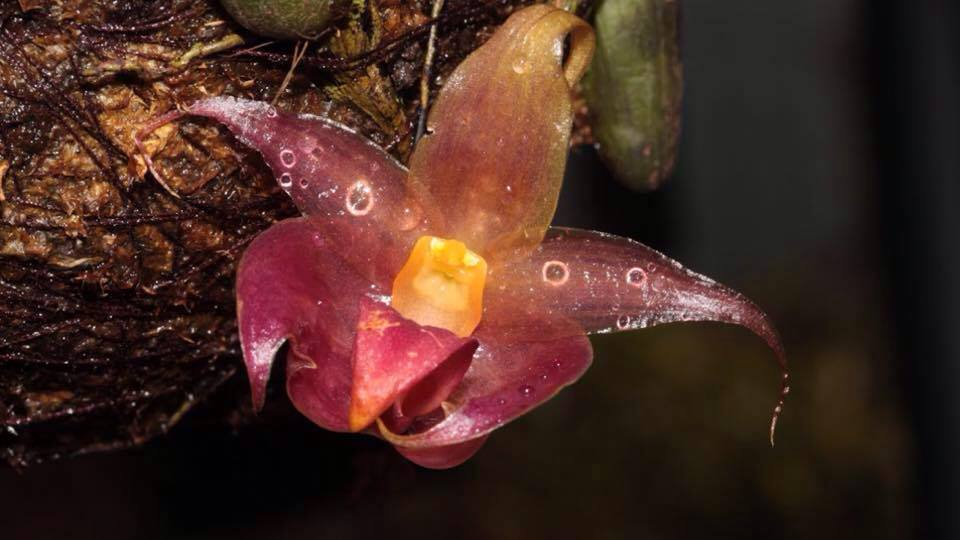
B.translucidum

== Bibliography ==
- J.J. Vermeulen : Orchid Monographs Vol. 7 (1993), A taxonomic revision of Bulbophyllum, sections Adelopetalum, Lepanthanthe, Macrouris, Pelma, Peltopus, and Uncifera (Orchidaceae). iv + 324 pp., 25 text-figs. + 116 full-page line drawings, 6 pp. colour plates. ISBN 90-71236-17-X
- Siegerist E.S.: - Bulbophyllums and their allies Timber Press, 2001, 77 colour photos, 296 pp ISBN 0-88192-506-3 - devoted solely to Bulbophyllums, it is an introductory guide for amateur and advanced orchid growers.
