= Section (taxonomy) =

Taxonomic rank

The hierarchy of biological classification's eight major taxonomic ranks. Intermediate minor rankings are not shown.

In biology a section (Latin: sectio) is a taxonomic rank that is applied differently in botany and zoology.

== In botany ==
Within flora (plants), 'section' refers to a botanical rank below the genus, but above the species:

- Domain > Kingdom > Division > Class > Order > Family > Tribe > Genus > Subgenus > Section > Subsection > Species

== In zoology ==
Within fauna (animals), 'section' refers to an uncommonly used zoological rank below the order, but above the family:

- Domain > Kingdom > Phylum > Class > Order > Section > Family > Tribe > Genus > Species

The rank of Superfamily is commonly adopted instead.

== In bacteriology ==
The International Code of Nomenclature for Bacteria states that the Section rank is an informal one, between the subgenus and species (as in botany).
