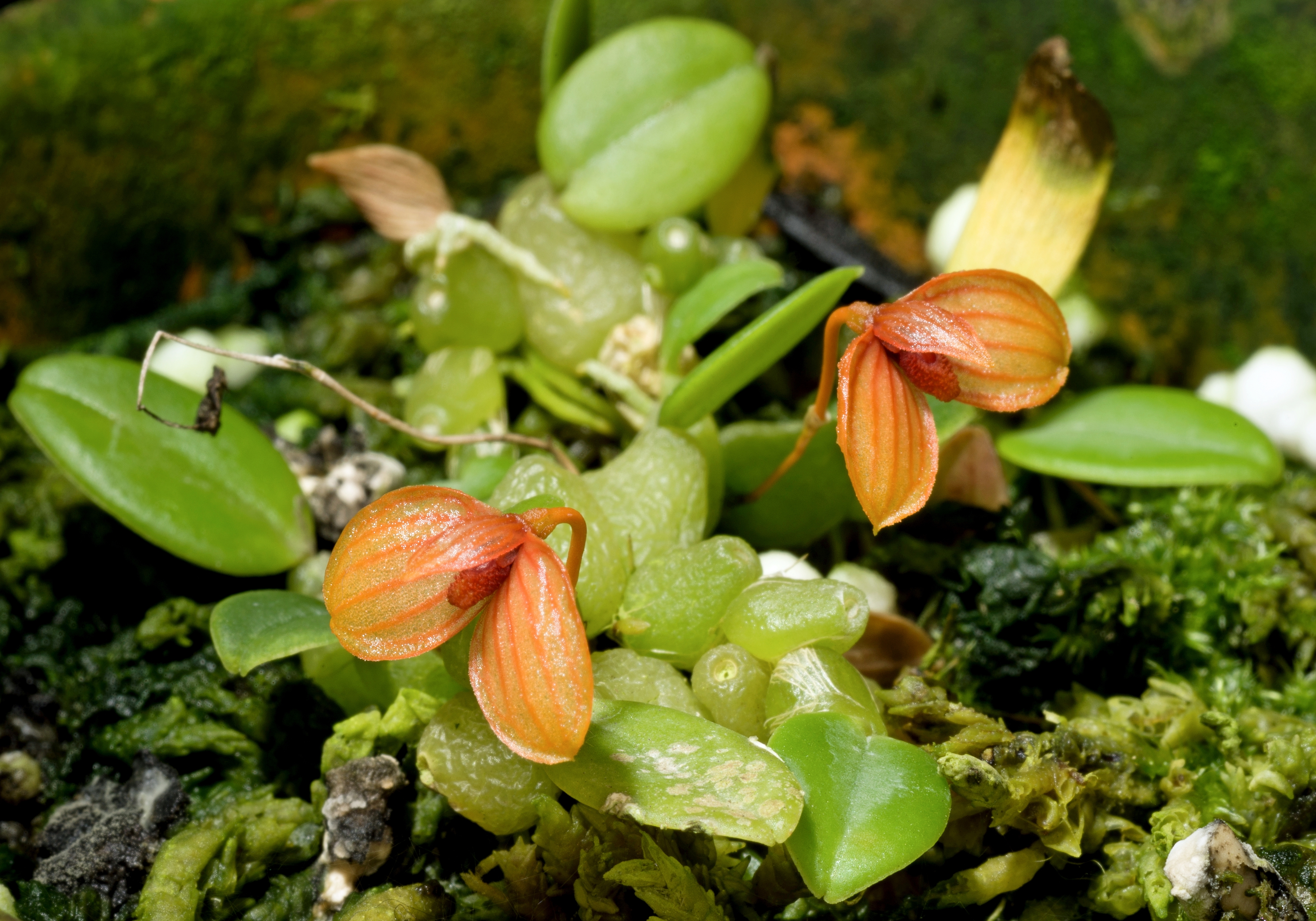
- Bulbophyllum ovalifolium

Scientific classification
- Kingdom: Plantae
- Clade: Tracheophytes
- Clade: Angiosperms
- Clade: Monocots
- Order: Asparagales
- Family: Orchidaceae
- Subfamily: Epidendroideae
- Genus: Bulbophyllum
- Section: Bulbophyllum sect. Macrocaulia (Bl.) Aver 1994

Type species
- Bulbophyllum ovalifolium

Species
- See text

Synonyms
- Bulbophyllum sect. Odoardiana Pfitz. 1889; Diphyes sect. Macrocaulia Bl. 1825; Bulbophyllum sect. Monilibulbus J.J.Sm. 1914

= Bulbophyllum sect. Macrocaulia =

Section of flowering plants

Bulbophyllum sect. Macrocaulia is a section of the genus Bulbophyllum.

== Description ==
Species in this section are epiphytes with creeping rhizomes with a pseudobulb with a single leaf and single flower.

== Distribution ==
Plants from this section are found in Southeast Asia.

== Species ==
Bulbophyllum section Macrocaulia comprises the following species:

Image	Name	Distribution	Elevation (m)
	Bulbophyllum adjungens Seidenf. 1979	Thailand	1,200 metres (3,900 ft)
	Bulbophyllum alatum J.J.Verm. 1991	Sabah Borneo	1,200–2,000 metres (3,900–6,600 ft)
	Bulbophyllum alboaligerum Cootes, Cabactulan, M.Leon & R.B.Pimentel 2018	Philippines	1,600 metres (5,200 ft)
	Bulbophyllum amorosoanum Naive, M.Leon & Cootes 2017	Philippines (Bukidnon)	1,200–2,100 metres (3,900–6,900 ft)
	Bulbophyllum anguliferum Ames & C. Schweinf. 1920	Borneo	2,200 metres (7,200 ft)
	Bulbophyllum anisopterum J.J.Verm. & P.O'Byrne 2003	Borneo	1,200–1,900 metres (3,900–6,200 ft)
	Bulbophyllum aschemon J.J.Verm. & A.L.Lamb 2008	Malaysia and Sarawak Borneo	
	Bulbophyllum auriculatum J.J.Verm. & P.O'Byrne 2003	Sulawesi	1,200–1,900 metres (3,900–6,200 ft)
	Bulbophyllum bilobipetalum J.J. Sm. 1927	Kalimantan Borneo	1,400 metres (4,600 ft)
	Bulbophyllum biseriale Carr 1930	Thailand and Malaysia	300–1,900 metres (980–6,230 ft)
	Bulbophyllum bonjolianum Yudistira, Candra & Mustaqim 2024	Sumatera	1,000–1,200 metres (3,300–3,900 ft)
	Bulbophyllum bryoides Carr 1957	Vietnam	
	Bulbophyllum calyptogyne J.J.Verm. & P.O'Byrne 2011	Sulawesi	1,700–1,800 metres (5,600–5,900 ft)
	Bulbophyllum carrianum J.J.Verm. 2000	Borneo	800–900 metres (2,600–3,000 ft)
	Bulbophyllum catenarium Ridl. 1894	Malaysia, Borneo and Vietnam	700–2,500 metres (2,300–8,200 ft)
	Bulbophyllum cernuum [Bl.]Lindl. 1830	Thailand, Borneo and Java	610–1,850 metres (2,000–6,070 ft)
	Bulbophyllum chanii J.J.Verm. & A.L.Lamb 1991	Sabah Borneo	1,400–1,900 metres (4,600–6,200 ft)
	Bulbophyllum chlorascens J.J. Sm. 1927	Sumatra	
	Bulbophyllum coelochilum J.J.Verm. 1991	Sabah Borneo	1,300–1,500 metres (4,300–4,900 ft)
	Bulbophyllum connatum Carr 1933	Sumatra	1,525–1,600 metres (5,003–5,249 ft)
	Bulbophyllum corticola Schlechter 1910	Borneo	
	Bulbophyllum dibothron J.J.Verm. & A.L.Lamb 1994	Sabah and Sarawak	1,200–2,000 metres (3,900–6,600 ft)
	Bulbophyllum didymotropis Seidenf. 1979	China (Yunnan) and Thailand	1,400–1,600 metres (4,600–5,200 ft)
	Bulbophyllum dransfieldii J.J.Verm. 1991	Borneo	2,000 metres (6,600 ft)
	Bulbophyllum exquisitum Ames 1923	Philippines	2,100–2,400 metres (6,900–7,900 ft)
	Bulbophyllum fulgens J.J.Verm. 1996	Sumatra	1,600–1,700 metres (5,200–5,600 ft)
	Bulbophyllum gofferjeei J.J.Verm. & Lamb 2013	Sabah Borneo	1,900–2,200 metres (6,200–7,200 ft)
	Bulbophyllum hodgsonii M.R.Hend. 1927	Malaysia in the Cameron Highlands	
	Bulbophyllum ignevenosum Carr 1930	peninsular Malaysia and Vietnam	1,600 metres (5,200 ft)
	Bulbophyllum inaequale (Blume) Lindl. 1830	Java	1,000–1,100 metres (3,300–3,600 ft)
	Bulbophyllum jayi J.J.Verm. & Lamb 2013	Sumatra, Borneo	200–300 metres (660–980 ft)
	Bulbophyllum kestron J.J.Verm. & A.L.Lamb 1988	Sabah Borneo	1,400–2,000 metres (4,600–6,600 ft)
	Bulbophyllum koilobasis J.J.Verm., P.O'Byrne & A.L.Lamb 2015	Borneo	1,200–2,000 metres (3,900–6,600 ft)
	Bulbophyllum konstantinovii Aver. 2013	Cambodia	100–200 metres (330–660 ft)
	Bulbophyllum lacinulosum J.J. Sm. 1927	Borneo	1,200–1,300 metres (3,900–4,300 ft)
	Bulbophyllum lambii J.J.Verm. 1991	Borneo	1,500–2,100 metres (4,900–6,900 ft)
	Bulbophyllum latisepalum Ames & C.Schweinf. 1920	Mt Kinabalu Borneo	1,300–2,100 metres (4,300–6,900 ft)
	Bulbophyllum leniae J.J.Verm. 1991	Borneo and Sulawesi	1,300–2,000 metres (4,300–6,600 ft)
	Bulbophyllum leproglossum J.J.Verm. & A.L.Lamb 1988	Borneo	1,300–1,500 metres (4,300–4,900 ft)
	Bulbophyllum longhutense J.J. Sm. 1931	Sabah and Kalimantan Borneo	250–1,700 metres (820–5,580 ft)
	Bulbophyllum longistelidium Ridl. 1924	peninsular Malaysia and Sabah Borneo	1,300 metres (4,300 ft)
	Bulbophyllum lyciachungianum P.O'Byrne & Gokusing 2016	Borneo	1,930 metres (6,330 ft)
	Bulbophyllum malleolabrum Carr 1932	Malaysia, Borneo and Sulawesi	100–1,700 metres (330–5,580 ft)
	Bulbophyllum menghaiense Z.H.Tsi 1981	Vietnam, China (Yunnan)	1,200–1,500 metres (3,900–4,900 ft)
	Bulbophyllum mindorense Ames 1907	the Philippines	500–1,000 metres (1,600–3,300 ft)
	Bulbophyllum minutulum Ridl. ex Burkill & Holttum 1923	peninsular Malaysia and Borneo	700–1,900 metres (2,300–6,200 ft)
	Bulbophyllum montense Ridl. 1894	Borneo	1,300–3,400 metres (4,300–11,200 ft)
	Bulbophyllum muluense J.J.Wood 1984	Borneo	1,500–2,400 metres (4,900–7,900 ft)
	Bulbophyllum nubinatum J.J.Verm. 1988	Borneo	2,000–3,000 metres (6,600–9,800 ft)
	Bulbophyllum odoardi Rchb.f. & Pfitzer 1884	Borneo	
	Bulbophyllum ovalifolium [Bl] Lindl. 1830	China, Thailand, Malaysia, Sumatra, Java, Borneo, lesser Sunda Islands and Sulawesi	900–2,500 metres (3,000–8,200 ft)
	Bulbophyllum pan Ridl. 1915	peninsular Malaysia	
	Bulbophyllum pelicanopsis J.J.Verm. & A.L.Lamb 1988	Sabah Borneo	1,200–1,700 metres (3,900–5,600 ft)
	Bulbophyllum pentaneurum Seidenf. 1979	Thailand	800 metres (2,600 ft)
	Bulbophyllum perryi J.J.Verm. & Kindler 2015	Sumatra	
	Bulbophyllum phaeoneuron Schltr. 1911	Borneo	1,400–2,000 metres (4,600–6,600 ft)
	Bulbophyllum physocoryphum Seidenf. 1979	Vietnam, Thailand, Laos, Cambodia	
	Bulbophyllum proculcastris J.J.Verm. 2000	Borneo	1,800 metres (5,900 ft)
	Bulbophyllum puntjakense J.J. Sm. 1907	Java, Borneo and the Lesser Sundas Islands	1,500–2,000 metres (4,900–6,600 ft)
	Bulbophyllum pyridion J.J.Verm. 1991	Borneo	1,500 metres (4,900 ft)
	Bulbophyllum remiferum Carr 1933	Sumatra	1,525 metres (5,003 ft)
	Bulbophyllum scabrum J.J.Verm. & A.L.Lamb 1988	Borneo	1,500–1,700 metres (4,900–5,600 ft)
	Bulbophyllum schefferi (Kuntze) Schltr. 1915	Java, Sumatra, Sabah, Kalimantan and Sarawak Borneo and the Philippines	400–1,100 metres (1,300–3,600 ft)
	Bulbophyllum similissimum J.J.Verm.1991	Borneo	1,300–1,500 metres (4,300–4,900 ft)
	Bulbophyllum simplicilabellum Seidenf. 1979	Thailand	1,200–1,400 metres (3,900–4,600 ft)
	Bulbophyllum stormii J.J. Sm. 1907	Malaysia, Sumatra and Borneo	1,000–2,000 metres (3,300–6,600 ft)
	Bulbophyllum streptomorphum J.J.Verm., O'Byrne and Lamb 2015	Borneo	1,400–2,000 metres (4,600–6,600 ft)
	Bulbophyllum tekuense Carr 1930	peninsular Malaysia	1,600 metres (5,200 ft)
	Bulbophyllum thymophorum J.J.Verm.& A.L.Lamb 1988	Sabah Borneo	1,600–1,900 metres (5,200–6,200 ft)
	Bulbophyllum titanea Ridl. 1908	peninsular Malaysia	
	Bulbophyllum torajarum J.J.Verm. & P.O'Byrne 2008	Sulawesi	1,900–2,500 metres (6,200–8,200 ft)
	Bulbophyllum trinervosum Victoriano & Yudistira 2020	West Java, Indonesia	1,300–1,550 metres (4,270–5,090 ft)
	Bulbophyllum tristriatum Carr 1930	Thailand, peninsular Malaysia and Sabah Borneo	800 metres (2,600 ft)
	Bulbophyllum tubilabrum J.J.Verm. & P.O'Byrne 2003	Sulawesi	1,800 metres (5,900 ft)
	Bulbophyllum vestigipetalum J.J.Verm. & Lamb 2013	Borneo	500–600 metres (1,600–2,000 ft)
