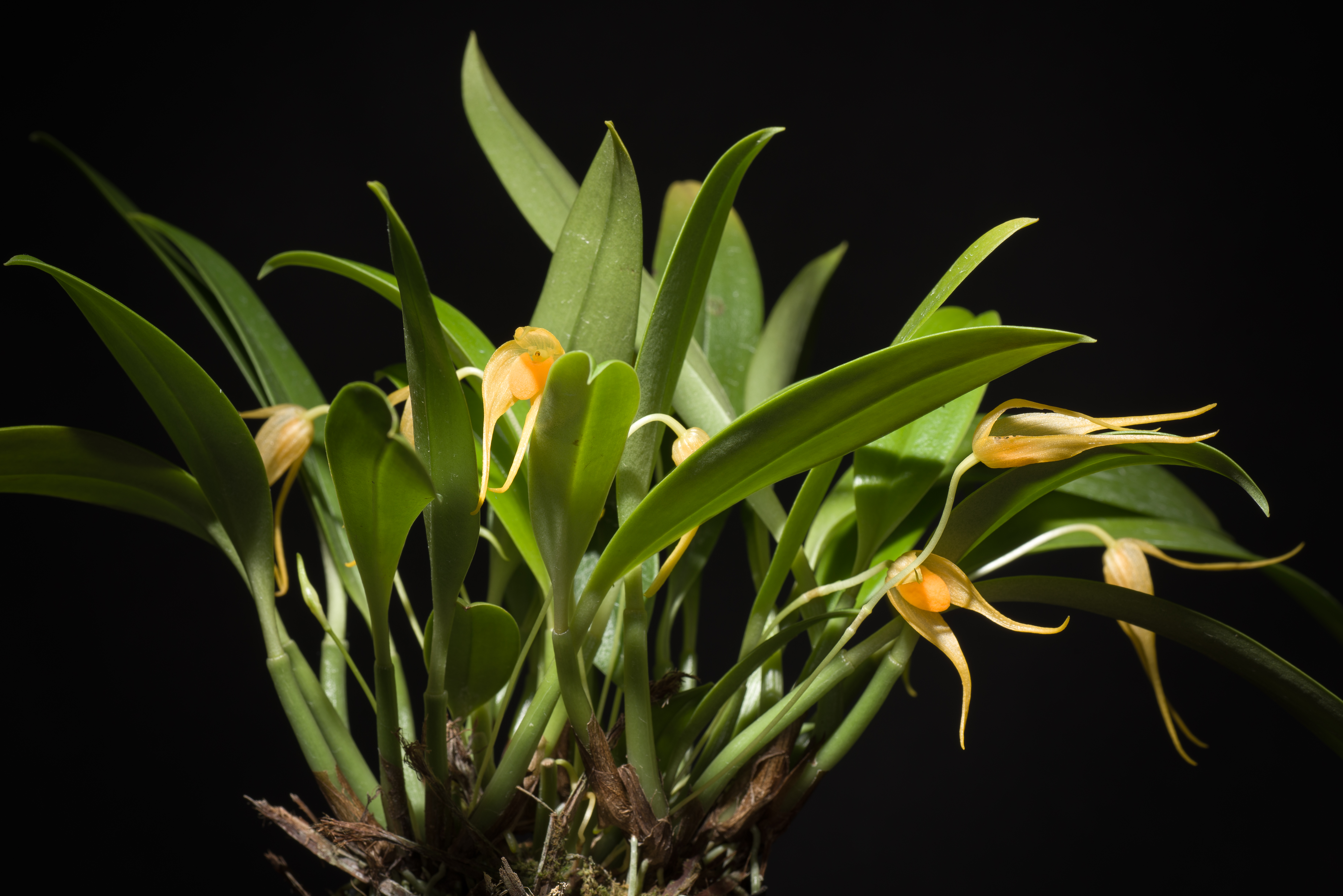
- Bulbophyllum ankylochele

Scientific classification
- Kingdom: Plantae
- Clade: Tracheophytes
- Clade: Angiosperms
- Clade: Monocots
- Order: Asparagales
- Family: Orchidaceae
- Subfamily: Epidendroideae
- Genus: Bulbophyllum
- Section: Bulbophyllum sect. Peltopus; Schltr. 1914[1912]

Type species
- Bulbophyllum peltopus

Species
- See text

= Bulbophyllum sect. Peltopus =

Section of flowering plants

Bulbophyllum sect. Peltopus is a section of the genus Bulbophyllum.

== Description ==
Species in this section is are rhizomes creeping or straggling with pseudobulbs that bloom with a single leaf and a single flower. Young shoots sprouting and develop near the top of the pseudobulb.

== Distribution ==
Plants from this section are found in Papua New Guinea, New Caledonia, Vanuatu and Fiji.

== Species ==
Bulbophyllum section Peltopus comprises the following species:

Image	Name	Distribution	Elevation (m)
	Bulbophyllum adolinae Schuit., Wanma, Mambor & Heatubun 2018	western New Guinea	1,970 metres (6,460 ft)
	Bulbophyllum aechmophorum J.J.Verm. 1993	New Guinea	1,800–2,900 metres (5,900–9,500 ft)
	Bulbophyllum algidum Ridl. 1916	New Guinea	3,200 metres (10,500 ft)
	Bulbophyllum alveatum J.J.Verm. 1993	Papua New Guinea	1,800–2,000 metres (5,900–6,600 ft)
	Bulbophyllum ankylochele J.J.Verm. 1993	New Guinea	1,700–2,300 metres (5,600–7,500 ft)
	Bulbophyllum aphanopetalum Schltr. 1906	New Guinea, New Caledonia and Fiji	1,700–2,300 metres (5,600–7,500 ft)
	Bulbophyllum artostigma J.J.Verm. 1993	Papua New Guinea	200–1,200 metres (660–3,940 ft)
	Bulbophyllum bliteum J.J.Verm. 1993	New Guinea	
	Bulbophyllum brachypetalum Schltr. 1913	New Guinea	2,200–3,000 metres (7,200–9,800 ft)
	Bulbophyllum brassii J.J.Verm. 1993	New Guinea	1,300 metres (4,300 ft)
	Bulbophyllum calviventer J.J.Verm. 1993	eastern New Guinea	2,700–3,100 metres (8,900–10,200 ft)
	Bulbophyllum concavibasalis P.Royen 1979	New Guinea	3,300 metres (10,800 ft)
	Bulbophyllum cycloglossum Schltr. 1913	New Guinea	2,500–3,400 metres (8,200–11,200 ft)
	Bulbophyllum discolor Schltr. 1913	New Guinea	1,000 metres (3,300 ft)
	Bulbophyllum hapalocodon J.J.Verm., Schuit. & de Vogel 2018	western New Guinea	2,600–2,700 metres (8,500–8,900 ft)
	Bulbophyllum hiljeae J.J.Verm. 1991	Papua New Guinea	2,000 metres (6,600 ft)
	Bulbophyllum inciferum J.J.Verm. 1993	New Guinea	2,000 metres (6,600 ft)
	Bulbophyllum kenae J.J.Verm. 1993	New Guinea	2,800–3,100 metres (9,200–10,200 ft)
	Bulbophyllum lophoton J.J.Verm. 1993	New Guinea	2,200–2,300 metres (7,200–7,500 ft)
	Bulbophyllum minutipetalum Schltr 1913	Papua New Guinea	1,900–2,000 metres (6,200–6,600 ft)
	Bulbophyllum nubigenum Schltr. 1913	New Guinea	2,400 metres (7,900 ft)
	Bulbophyllum octarrhenipetalum J.J.Sm. 1913	New Guinea, Vanuatu	1,600–2,300 metres (5,200–7,500 ft)
	Bulbophyllum origami J.J.Verm. 1993	Papua New Guinea	2,000–2,200 metres (6,600–7,200 ft)
	Bulbophyllum ortalis J.J.Verm. 1993	New Guinea	1,700–2,000 metres (5,600–6,600 ft)
	Bulbophyllum patella J.J.Verm. 1993	Papua New Guinea	1,600–2,500 metres (5,200–8,200 ft)
	Bulbophyllum peltopus Schltr. 1913	Papua New Guinea	1,300 metres (4,300 ft)
	Bulbophyllum plicatum J.J.Verm. 1993	New Guinea	1,800 metres (5,900 ft)
	Bulbophyllum ptychantyx J.J.Verm. 1993	eastern New Guinea	2,500–3,000 metres (8,200–9,800 ft)
	Bulbophyllum reevei J.J.Verm. 1992	New Guinea	2,100–3,100 metres (6,900–10,200 ft)
	Bulbophyllum rhodoleucum Schltr.1913	eastern New Guinea	1,800–2,800 metres (5,900–9,200 ft)
	Bulbophyllum santoense J.J.Verm. 1993	Vanuatu and Espiritu Santo	1,500–1,600 metres (4,900–5,200 ft)
	Bulbophyllum scutiferum J.J.Verm. 1993	New Guinea	2,300–3,300 metres (7,500–10,800 ft)
	Bulbophyllum subapetalum J.J.Sm. 1915	New Guinea	
	Bulbophyllum thelantyx J.J.Verm. 1993	New Guinea	1,800–3,000 metres (5,900–9,800 ft)
	Bulbophyllum triaristella Schltr. 1913	New Guinea	1,000–3,300 metres (3,300–10,800 ft)
