= Bulbophyllum sect. Brachypus =

Scientific classification
- Kingdom: Plantae
- Clade: Tracheophytes
- Clade: Angiosperms
- Clade: Monocots
- Order: Asparagales
- Family: Orchidaceae
- Subfamily: Epidendroideae
- Genus: Bulbophyllum
- Section: Bulbophyllum sect. Brachypus; Schltr. 1912

Type species
- Bulbophyllum maxillarioides

Species
- See text

Section of flowering plants

Bulbophyllum sect. Brachypus is a section of the genus Bulbophyllum.

== Description ==
Species in this section is distinguished by its single flower on each inflorescence with 4 pollina

== Distribution ==
Plants from this section are found from Papua New Guinea to New Caledonia, Borneo and Australia.

== Species ==
Bulbophyllum section Brachypus comprises the following species:

Image	Name	Distribution	Elevation (m)
	Bulbophyllum apiculatum Schltr. 1913	New Guinea	1,000 metres (3,300 ft)
	Bulbophyllum blepharopetalum Schltr. 1913	New Guinea	600 metres (2,000 ft)
	Bulbophyllum brachygnomon J.J.Verm., Schuit. & de Vogel 2018	New Guinea	
	Bulbophyllum calceilabium J.J.Sm. 1929	western New Guinea	1,420 metres (4,660 ft)
	Bulbophyllum cerinum Schltr. 1913	New Guinea and the Solomon Islands	1,000–1,520 metres (3,280–4,990 ft)
	Bulbophyllum chionanthum J.J.Verm., Schuit. & de Vogel 2018	New Guinea	1,200 metres (3,900 ft)
	Bulbophyllum galactanthum Schltr. 1921	Papua New Guinea	
	Bulbophyllum giriwoense J.J.Sm. 1914	Papua New Guinea	
	Bulbophyllum gunteri J.J.Verm., Schuit. & de Vogel 2018	New Guinea	
	Bulbophyllum hans-meyeri J.J.Wood 1981	New Guinea	750 metres (2,460 ft)
	Bulbophyllum ialibuense Ormerod 2002	New Guinea	
	Bulbophyllum katjae J.J.Verm., Schuit. & de Vogel 2018	Papua New Guinea	400–1,700 metres (1,300–5,600 ft)
	Bulbophyllum latibrachiatum J.J.Sm. 1908	New Guinea	700–1,000 metres (2,300–3,300 ft)
	Bulbophyllum lineolatum Schltr. 1913	New Guinea	850–1,100 metres (2,790–3,610 ft)
	Bulbophyllum magnussonianum J.J.Verm., de Vogel & A.Vogel 2010	Bismarck archipelago	
	Bulbophyllum maxillarioides Schltr. 1905	Papua New Guinea	200–300 metres (660–980 ft)
	Bulbophyllum microlabium W.Kittr. 1984 publ. 1985	Papua New Guinea	
	Bulbophyllum najae J.J.Verm., Schuit. & de Vogel 2018	Papua New Guinea	500–1,000 metres (1,600–3,300 ft)
	Bulbophyllum nematopodum F. Muell. 1872	Australia (Queensland)	400–1,200 metres (1,300–3,900 ft)
	Bulbophyllum palleucum J.J.Verm., Schuit. & de Vogel 2018	western New Guinea	400–500 metres (1,300–1,600 ft)
	Bulbophyllum phaeoglossum Schltr. 1913	New Guinea	1,800 metres (5,900 ft)
	Bulbophyllum pterodon J.J.Verm., Schuit. & de Vogel 2018	Papua New Guinea	1,600–1,700 metres (5,200–5,600 ft)
	Bulbophyllum rhomboglossum Schltr. 1913	New Guinea and Vanuatu	150 metres (490 ft)
	Bulbophyllum schistocodon J.J.Verm., Schuit. & de Vogel 2018	Vanuatu	500–600 metres (1,600–2,000 ft)
	Bulbophyllum stolleanum Schltr. 1923	Papua New Guinea	150 metres (490 ft)
	Bulbophyllum tetratropis J.J.Verm., Schuit. & de Vogel 2018	Solomon Islands	1,900 metres (6,200 ft)
	Bulbophyllum trutiniferum J.J.Verm., Schuit. & de Vogel 2018	Papua New Guinea	2,400–2,500 metres (7,900–8,200 ft)
	Bulbophyllum tumidum J.J.Verm. 1991	Borneo	1,300 metres (4,300 ft)
	Bulbophyllum turgidum J.J.Verm. 1991	Borneo	
	Bulbophyllum variculosum J.J.Verm. 2008	western New Guinea	600 metres (2,000 ft)
	Bulbophyllum versteegii J.J.Sm. 1908	New Guinea	1,000–1,200 metres (3,300–3,900 ft)
	Bulbophyllum wollastonii Ridl. 1916	western New Guinea	
	Bulbophyllum yumtei J.J.Verm., Schuit. & de Vogel 2018	western New Guinea	600 metres (2,000 ft)
