= Origami (disambiguation) =

Origami is the Japanese art of paper folding.

Origami may also refer to:

== Science ==
- Bulbophyllum origami, a species of orchid
- DNA origami, the folding of DNA to create two- and three-dimensional shapes at the nanoscale
- Ultra-mobile PC, originally code-named Project Origami, a miniature version of a pen computer

== Arts, entertainment, and media ==
- Origami (magic trick), a stage illusion with a Japanese paperfolding theme
- Origami (film), a 2017 Canadian film
- Paper Mario: The Origami King, a 2020 video game
- Origami!, a song by American singer-songwriter Kesha

== Other uses ==
- Certificate of authenticity of a Japanese sword
- Type of document used, for example, in the Imperial Court of Kyoto
