= Bulbophyllum scotinochiton =

Scientific classification
- Kingdom: Plantae
- Clade: Tracheophytes
- Clade: Angiosperms
- Clade: Monocots
- Order: Asparagales
- Family: Orchidaceae
- Subfamily: Epidendroideae
- Genus: Bulbophyllum
- Section: Bulbophyllum sect. Plumata
- Species: B. scotinochiton

Binomial name
- Bulbophyllum scotinochiton J.J.Verm. & P.O'Byrne 2005

Species of orchid

Bulbophyllum scotinochiton is a species of orchid found in Sumatra.

== Description ==
Plants have 1.3-1.5 cm long by 0.7-1.1 cm wide, quadrangular pseudobulbs that are separated 2.5 mm by rhizomes. Pseudobulbs have a single leaf. Leaves are elliptic 3.8-4.5 cm long and 2.1-2.4 cm wide. Plants bloom with a single flower on a 10 cm inflorescence. Flowers have a 5mm acute bract and do not fully open. The dorsal sepal is white with a green center. Lateral sepals are white to blackish purple spots, elliptic. The lip is recurved. Flowers contain 4 pollina.

== Distribution ==
Plants are found growing in under story mossy oak forest near Lake Toba in Sumatra at elevation around 1,500 meters.

Front of flower

Side view of flower

Closeup of flower
