= Bulbophyllum amorosoanum =

Scientific classification
- Kingdom: Plantae
- Clade: Tracheophytes
- Clade: Angiosperms
- Clade: Monocots
- Order: Asparagales
- Family: Orchidaceae
- Subfamily: Epidendroideae
- Genus: Bulbophyllum
- Species: B. amorosoanum

Binomial name
- Bulbophyllum amorosoanum Naive, M.Leon & Cootes 2017

Synonyms
- Bulbophyllum amorosum Naive, M.Leon & Cootes 2017

Species of plant

Bulbophyllum amorosoanum is a species of orchid in the genus Bulbophyllum found in Bukidnon, Mindanao, Philippines.

== Description ==
Plants are epiphytes with creeping terete rhizomes with ovoid to ellipsoid, unifoliate, pseudobulbs that are 2.5 – 4 mm long with a diameter of 1.9 - 2.3 mm. The pseudobulbs are covered in a papery sheath. The leaves are elliptic, glabrous with dimensions of 2–5 mm × 1.5–2 mm.

The inflorescence arises from under the pseudobulb and is 15 mm with a single orange flower. The peduncle is 11 mm long and terete. The flower has a triangular dorsal sepal 2.4 mm × 0.8 mm, ovate lateral sepals that are 3 veined and 2.7 mm × 1.3 mm, and linear petals that are 1.1 mm × 0.3 mm. The lip of the flower is narrowly tongue-like with a papillose abaxial surface. The column is 0.3 mm × 0.4 mm.

== Distribution ==
The plant is found growing moss cushions of branches and trunks of trees in deeply shaded rain forest in the Kalatungan Mountain Range at elevations between 1200 and 2100 meters.

== Taxonomy ==
This species was first collected on July 15, 2016, in Bukidnon at elevations of 1200 meters.

Bulbophyllum amorosoanum was described in the German journal Die Orchidee in 2017 by Mark Arcebal Naive, Dr. Miguel David De Leon, and Jim Cootes. The plant was published online as Bulbophyllum amorosum. The species is in Bulbophyllum sect. Macrocaulia and is most similar to Bulbophyllum montense but differs in the shape of the lip, petals, and sepals.

The plant was named after Dr. Victor Amoroso from Central Mindanao University, Philippines.
