= Bulbophyllum kaniense =

Scientific classification
- Kingdom: Plantae
- Clade: Tracheophytes
- Clade: Angiosperms
- Clade: Monocots
- Order: Asparagales
- Family: Orchidaceae
- Subfamily: Epidendroideae
- Genus: Bulbophyllum
- Section: Bulbophyllum sect. Macrouris
- Species: B. kaniense

Binomial name
- Bulbophyllum kaniense Schltr.

Synonyms
- Bulbophyllum dispersum Schltr. 1913; Bulbophyllum dispersum var. roseans Schltr. 1913; Bulbophyllum extensum Schltr. 1913

Species of orchid

Bulbophyllum kaniense is a species of orchid in the genus Bulbophyllum.
