= Bulbophyllum mirum =

The enchanting bulbophyllum

Scientific classification
- Kingdom: Plantae
- Clade: Tracheophytes
- Clade: Angiosperms
- Clade: Monocots
- Order: Asparagales
- Family: Orchidaceae
- Subfamily: Epidendroideae
- Genus: Bulbophyllum
- Section: Bulbophyllum sect. Plumata
- Species: B. mirum

Binomial name
- Bulbophyllum mirum J.J. Sm., 1906

Synonyms
- Cirrhopetalum mirum (J.J. Sm.) Schltr.; Rhytionanthos mirum (J.J. Sm.) Garay, Hamer & Siegerist

Species of orchid

Bulbophyllum mirum is a species of orchid in the genus Bulbophyllum.

== Distribution ==
Its natural distribution is peninsular Thailand, Malaysia, and on Sumatra, Java, Borneo and the Lesser Sunda Islands of Indonesia. It grows in humid montane forests at altitudes from 1,000 m (3,300 ft) to 1,600 m (5,200 ft).
