= Bulbophyllum pyridion =

Scientific classification
- Kingdom: Plantae
- Clade: Tracheophytes
- Clade: Angiosperms
- Clade: Monocots
- Order: Asparagales
- Family: Orchidaceae
- Subfamily: Epidendroideae
- Genus: Bulbophyllum
- Species: B. pyridion

Binomial name
- Bulbophyllum pyridion J. J. Verm.

Species of orchid

Bulbophyllum pyridion is a species of orchid in the genus Bulbophyllum. It can be found in the forests of Borneo in altitudes of 1500 meters.
