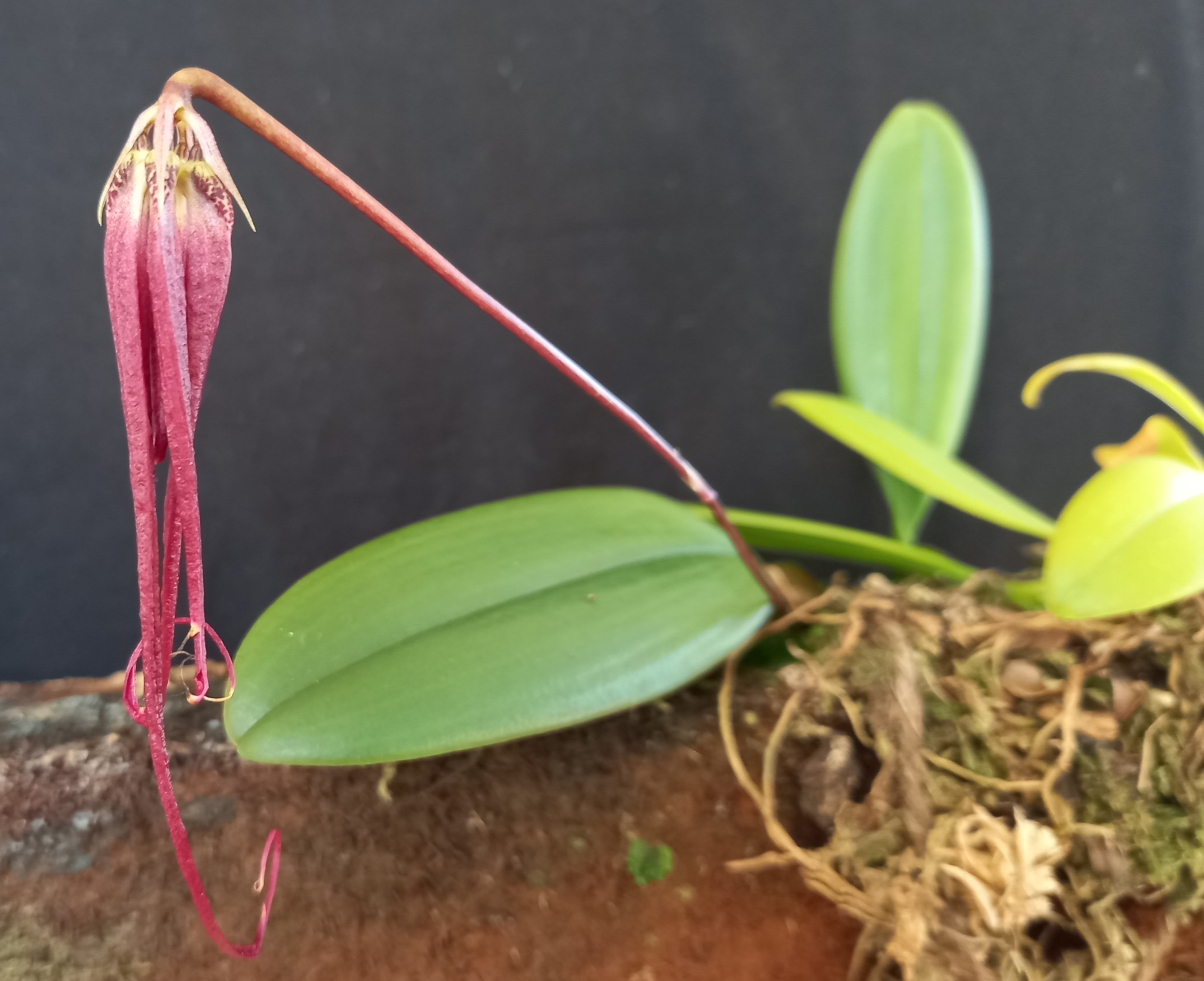

Conservation status
- CITES Appendix II (CITES)

Scientific classification
- Kingdom: Plantae
- Clade: Tracheophytes
- Clade: Angiosperms
- Clade: Monocots
- Order: Asparagales
- Family: Orchidaceae
- Subfamily: Epidendroideae
- Genus: Bulbophyllum
- Section: Bulbophyllum sect. Plumata
- Species: B. treschii

Binomial name
- Bulbophyllum treschii Jenny (2012)

Synonyms
- Cirrhopetalum treschii (Jenny) Cootes 2020

= Bulbophyllum treschii =

Species of orchid

Bulbophyllum treschii is a species of flowering plant in the family Orchidaceae.

== Distribution ==
The native range of the species is Peninsular Malaysia at elevations between 1,000–1,500 metres (3,300–4,900 ft). The plant is epiphytic and grows primarily in wet tropical biomes.
