= Bulbophyllum graciliscapum =

Scientific classification
- Kingdom: Plantae
- Clade: Tracheophytes
- Clade: Angiosperms
- Clade: Monocots
- Order: Asparagales
- Family: Orchidaceae
- Subfamily: Epidendroideae
- Genus: Bulbophyllum
- Section: Bulbophyllum sect. Macrouris
- Species: B. graciliscapum

Binomial name
- Bulbophyllum graciliscapum Schltr.

Synonyms
- Bulbophyllum setipes Schltr. 1913

Species of orchid

Bulbophyllum graciliscapum is a species of orchid in the genus Bulbophyllum.
