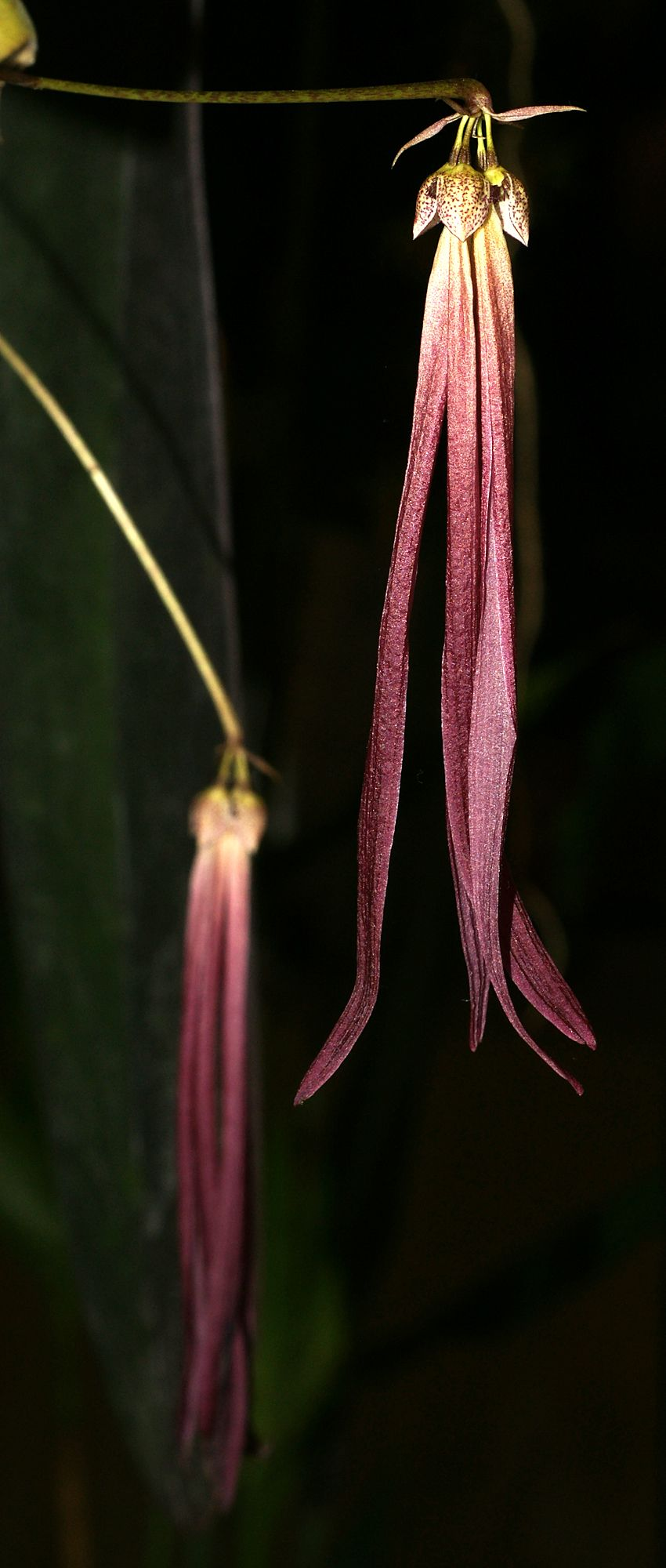

Scientific classification
- Kingdom: Plantae
- Clade: Tracheophytes
- Clade: Angiosperms
- Clade: Monocots
- Order: Asparagales
- Family: Orchidaceae
- Subfamily: Epidendroideae
- Genus: Bulbophyllum
- Section: Bulbophyllum sect. Plumata
- Species: B. plumatum

Binomial name
- Bulbophyllum plumatum Ames

Synonyms
- Cirrhopetalum plumatum (Ames) Cootes 2011; Rhytionanthos plumatum (Ames) Garay, Hamer & Siegerist 1994; Bulbophyllum jacobsonii J.J.Sm. 1935

= Bulbophyllum plumatum =

Species of orchid

Bulbophyllum plumatum is a species of orchid in the genus Bulbophyllum.

== Description ==
Bulbophyllum plumatum is a small epiphytic orchid and has 2-3 cm spacing between each obliquely ovoid pseudobulb. Each quadrangular pseudobulb, with concave sides, carries a single apical lanceolate leaf that narrows at the petiolate base. It flowers in a 10 cm long ascending, thin, cylindrical inflorescence, with a thicker apex bearing 4 umbelliform flowers at leaf height.

== Distribution ==
It is found in Malaysia, Sumatra and the Philippines in swamp forests at elevations around 1,000 to 1,500 meters.

== Taxonomy ==
Bulbophyllum plumatum discovered in 1913 by Oakes Ames on the island of Mindanao, Philippines, which was later described in Orchidaceae in 1915. The plant was later found in West Sumatera by E. Jacobson and was described by J.J. Smith as Dendrobium jacobsonii in 1935, which was later determined to be a synonym.
