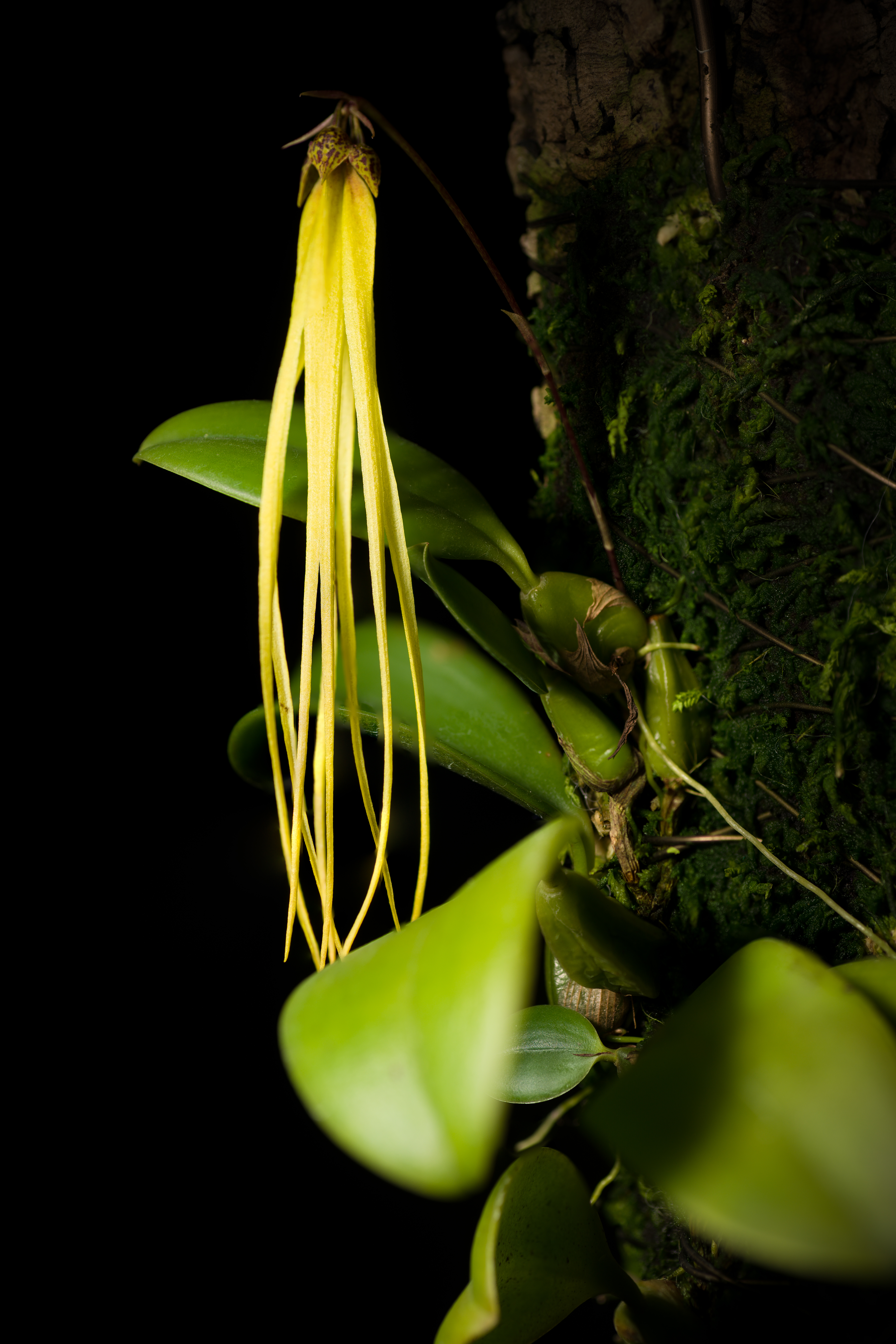
- Bulbophyllum thiurum

Scientific classification
- Kingdom: Plantae
- Clade: Tracheophytes
- Clade: Angiosperms
- Clade: Monocots
- Order: Asparagales
- Family: Orchidaceae
- Subfamily: Epidendroideae
- Genus: Bulbophyllum
- Section: Bulbophyllum sect. Plumata; J J Verm, Schuit, & De Vogel 2014

Type species
- Bulbophyllum plumatum

Species
- See text

= Bulbophyllum sect. Plumata =

Section of flowering plants

Bulbophyllum sect. Plumata is a section of the genus Bulbophyllum.

== Description ==
Species in this section have denticulate petal margins. This section is distinguished by the longitudinally furrowed column face.

== Distribution ==
Plants from this section are found in Southeast Asia.

== Species ==
Bulbophyllum section Plumata comprises the following species:

Image	Name	Distribution	Elevation (m)
	Bulbophyllum mirum J.J. Sm. 1906	Sabah Borneo, Sumatra, Java, Flores, Bali and peninsular Malaysia	1,000–1,600 metres (3,300–5,200 ft)
	Bulbophyllum plumatum Ames 1915	Malaysia, Sumatra and the Philippines	1,000–1,500 metres (3,300–4,900 ft)
	Bulbophyllum scotinochiton J.J.Verm. & P.O'Byrne 2005	Sumatra	1,500 metres (4,900 ft)
	Bulbophyllum thiurum Vermeulen & O'Byrne 2005	Malaysia	
	Bulbophyllum treschii Jenny 2012	Malaysia	1,000–1,500 metres (3,300–4,900 ft)
