= Bulbophyllum chloranthum =

Scientific classification
- Kingdom: Plantae
- Clade: Tracheophytes
- Clade: Angiosperms
- Clade: Monocots
- Order: Asparagales
- Family: Orchidaceae
- Subfamily: Epidendroideae
- Genus: Bulbophyllum
- Section: Bulbophyllum sect. Macrouris
- Species: B. chloranthum

Binomial name
- Bulbophyllum chloranthum Schltr.

Synonyms
- Bulbophyllum arcuatum Schltr. 1921; Bulbophyllum hedyothyrsus Schltr. 1913; Bulbophyllum macgregorii Schltr. 1911; Bulbophyllum solutisepalum J.J.Sm. 1929; Bulbophyllum squamiferum J.J.Sm. 1929; Cirrhopetalum macgregorii (Schltr.) Schltr. 1914

Species of orchid

Bulbophyllum chloranthum is a species of orchid in the genus Bulbophyllum.
