= Bulbophyllum dekockii =

Scientific classification
- Kingdom: Plantae
- Clade: Tracheophytes
- Clade: Angiosperms
- Clade: Monocots
- Order: Asparagales
- Family: Orchidaceae
- Subfamily: Epidendroideae
- Genus: Bulbophyllum
- Section: Bulbophyllum sect. Macrouris
- Species: B. dekockii

Binomial name
- Bulbophyllum dekockii J.J.Sm.

Synonyms
- Bulbophyllum jugicola P.Royen 1979

Species of orchid

Bulbophyllum dekockii is a species of orchid in the genus Bulbophyllum.
