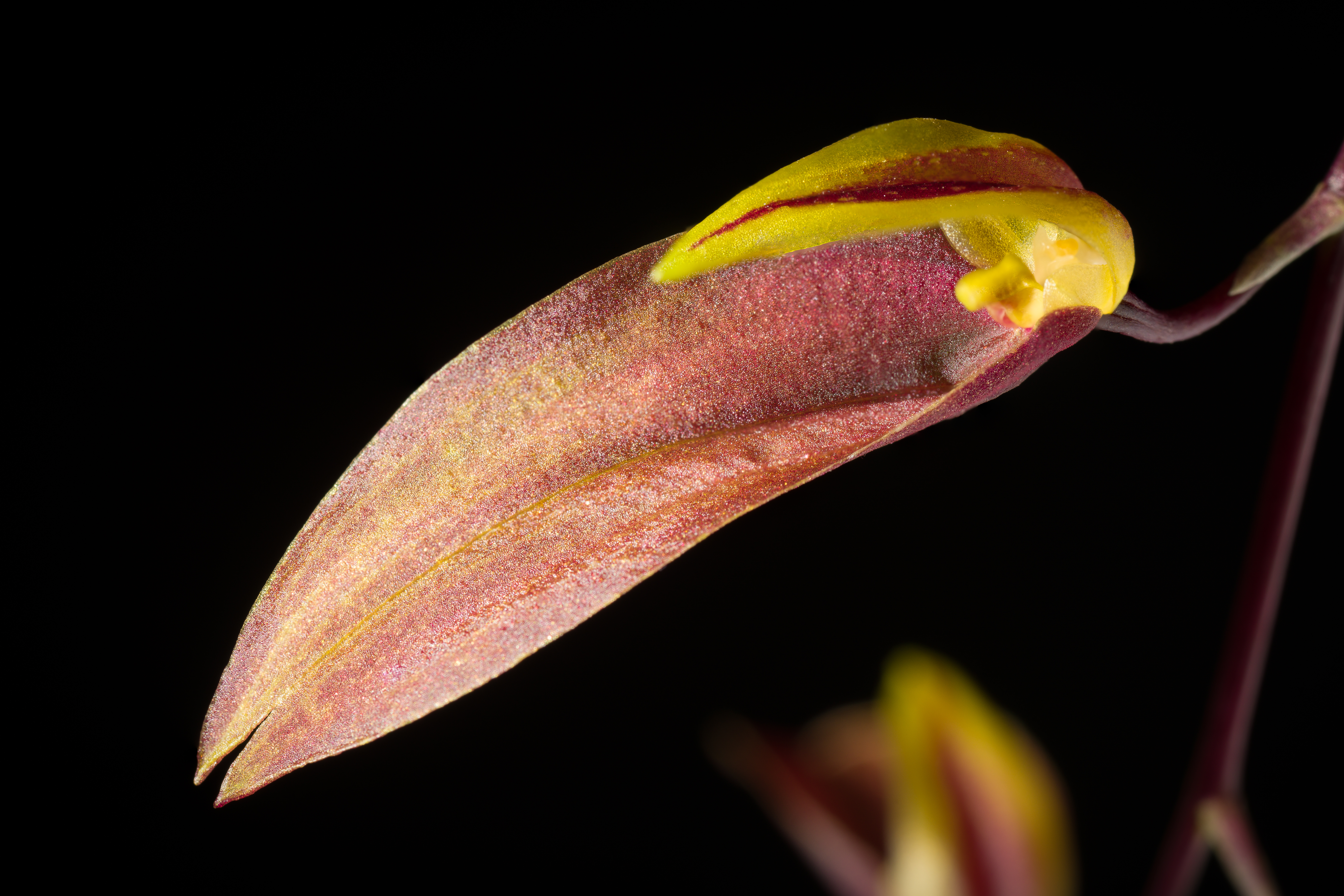

Scientific classification
- Kingdom: Plantae
- Clade: Tracheophytes
- Clade: Angiosperms
- Clade: Monocots
- Order: Asparagales
- Family: Orchidaceae
- Subfamily: Epidendroideae
- Genus: Bulbophyllum
- Section: Bulbophyllum sect. Macrouris
- Species: B. callichroma

Binomial name
- Bulbophyllum callichroma Schltr.

Synonyms
- Bulbophyllum calothyrsus Schltr. 1913; Bulbophyllum manifestans J.J.Sm. 1929

= Bulbophyllum callichroma =

Species of orchid

Bulbophyllum callichroma is a species of orchid in the genus Bulbophyllum.

== Distribution ==
Plants are found growing in Indonesia, Bismarck Archipelago, and New Guinea at elevation of 600–2,200 metres (2,000–7,200 ft).
