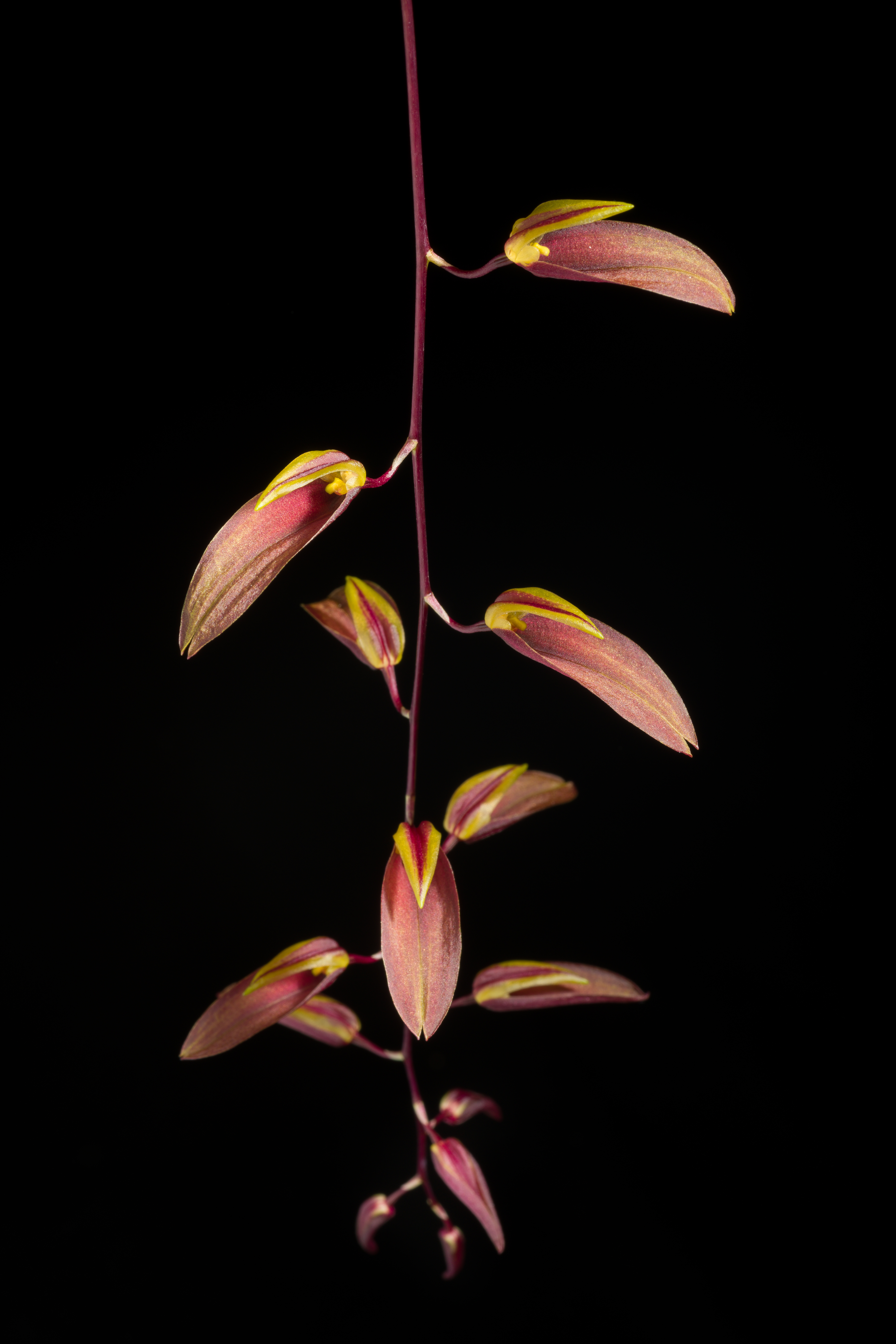
- Bulbophyllum callichroma

Scientific classification
- Kingdom: Plantae
- Clade: Tracheophytes
- Clade: Angiosperms
- Clade: Monocots
- Order: Asparagales
- Family: Orchidaceae
- Subfamily: Epidendroideae
- Genus: Bulbophyllum
- Section: Bulbophyllum sect. Macrouris; Schltr. 1913

Type species
- Bulbophyllum macrourum

Species
- See text

Synonyms
- Bulbophyllum sect. Hedyothyrsus Schlechter 1912; Bulbophyllum sect. Ischnopus Schlechter 1913

= Bulbophyllum sect. Macrouris =

Section of flowering plants

Bulbophyllum sect. Macrouris is a section of the genus Bulbophyllum.

== Description ==
Species in this section have a pseudobulb with a single leaf and inflorescence with multiple flowers.

== Distribution ==
Plants from this section are found in Southeast Asia.

== Species ==
Bulbophyllum section Macrouris comprises the following species:

Image	Name	Distribution	Elevation (m)
	Bulbophyllum callichroma Schltr. 1913	Indonesia and New Guinea	600–2,200 metres (2,000–7,200 ft)
	Bulbophyllum cardiophyllum J.J.Verm. 1991	Papua New Guinea	2,300 metres (7,500 ft)
	Bulbophyllum cateorum J.J.Verm. 1992	New Guinea	1,700–2,500 metres (5,600–8,200 ft)
	Bulbophyllum chloranthum Schltr. 1905	Papua and New Guinea, Indonesia, and the Solomon Islands	0–1,000 metres (0–3,281 ft)
	Bulbophyllum dekockii J.J.Sm. 1911	New Guinea	2,900–3,300 metres (9,500–10,800 ft)
	Bulbophyllum dendrochiloides Schltr. 1913	New Guinea	1,000 metres (3,300 ft)
	Bulbophyllum fonsflorum J.J.Verm. 1990	Papua New Guinea	1,800–2,800 metres (5,900–9,200 ft)
	Bulbophyllum graciliscapum Schlechter 1905	New Guinea, Solomons, Vanuatu	50–400 metres (160–1,310 ft)
	Bulbophyllum grammopoma J.J.Verm. 1991	New Guinea	1,600–2,600 metres (5,200–8,500 ft)
	Bulbophyllum hengstumianum J.J.Verm., de Vogel & A.Vogel 2010	Bismarck Archipelago	275 metres (902 ft)
	Bulbophyllum kaniense Schltr. 1913	New Guinea	1,000 metres (3,300 ft)
	Bulbophyllum levatii Kraenzl.1929	New Guinea, Solomon and Vanuatu Islands	1,000 metres (3,300 ft)
	Bulbophyllum macrourum Schltr. 1905	Papua New Guinea	800–2,000 metres (2,600–6,600 ft)
	Bulbophyllum mulderae J.J.Verm. 1993	New Guinea	1,500–2,000 metres (4,900–6,600 ft)
	Bulbophyllum myon J.J.Verm. 1990	Papua New Guinea	1,800–3,000 metres (5,900–9,800 ft)
	Bulbophyllum olivinum J.J.Sm. 1934	New Guinea	1,500–3,000 metres (4,900–9,800 ft)
	Bulbophyllum orbiculare J.J.Sm. 1912	Moluccas, New Guinea and the Solomon Islands	650–2,500 metres (2,130–8,200 ft)
	Bulbophyllum oreodoxa Schltr. 1913	New Guinea	450–1,500 metres (1,480–4,920 ft)
	Bulbophyllum phormion J.J.Verm. 1992	New Guinea	2,200–3,200 metres (7,200–10,500 ft)
	Bulbophyllum pidacanthum J.J.Verm. 1992	New Guinea	1,500–2,600 metres (4,900–8,500 ft)
	Bulbophyllum sceliphron J.J.Verm. 1991	Papua New Guinea	2,000 metres (6,600 ft)
	Bulbophyllum scopa J.J.Verm. 1990	New Guinea	1,200–2,000 metres (3,900–6,600 ft)
	Bulbophyllum subpatulum J.J.Verm. 2002	New Guinea	0–2,450 metres (0–8,038 ft)
	Bulbophyllum trifilum J.J.Sm. 1908	Moluccas and New Guinea	300–2,400 metres (980–7,870 ft)
