= Bulbophyllum physocoryphum =

Scientific classification
- Kingdom: Plantae
- Clade: Tracheophytes
- Clade: Angiosperms
- Clade: Monocots
- Order: Asparagales
- Family: Orchidaceae
- Subfamily: Epidendroideae
- Genus: Bulbophyllum
- Species: B. physocoryphum

Binomial name
- Bulbophyllum physocoryphum Seidenf.

Species of orchid

Bulbophyllum physocoryphum is a species of orchid in the genus Bulbophyllum. Found in Thailand and Laos, it is an epiphyte that can withstand a wide range of temperatures.
