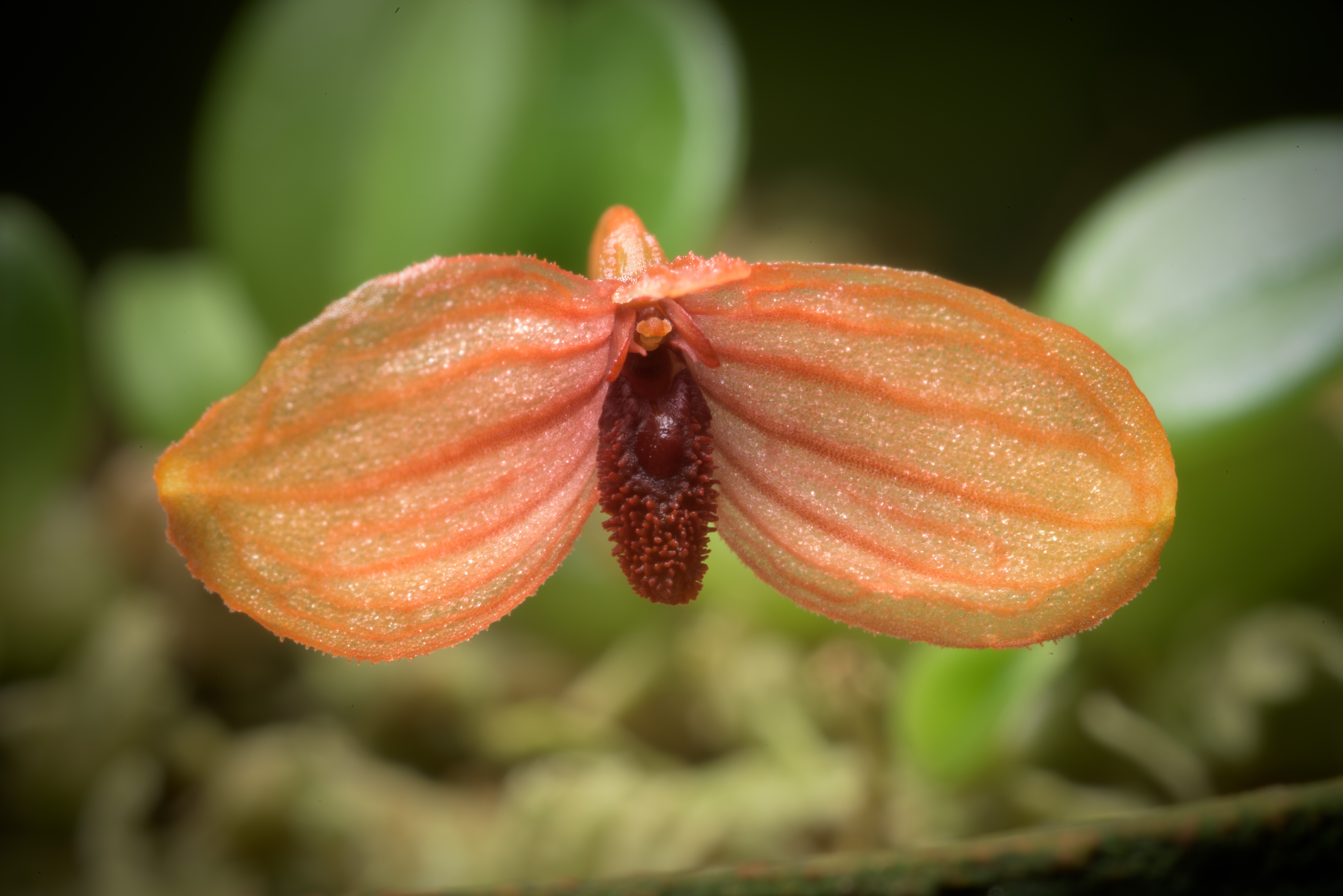

Scientific classification
- Kingdom: Plantae
- Clade: Tracheophytes
- Clade: Angiosperms
- Clade: Monocots
- Order: Asparagales
- Family: Orchidaceae
- Subfamily: Epidendroideae
- Genus: Bulbophyllum
- Species: B. ovalifolium

Binomial name
- Bulbophyllum ovalifolium (Blume) Lindl.

Synonyms
- Bulbophyllum amblyoglossum Schltr.; Bulbophyllum ariel Ridl.

= Bulbophyllum ovalifolium =

Species of orchid

Bulbophyllum ovalifolium is a species of orchid in the genus Bulbophyllum.
