= Bulbophyllum alveatum =

Scientific classification
- Kingdom: Plantae
- Clade: Tracheophytes
- Clade: Angiosperms
- Clade: Monocots
- Order: Asparagales
- Family: Orchidaceae
- Subfamily: Epidendroideae
- Genus: Bulbophyllum
- Species: B. alveatum

Binomial name
- Bulbophyllum alveatum J.J.Verm.

Species of orchid

Bulbophyllum alveatum is a species of orchid in the genus Bulbophyllum found in Papua New Guinea.
