= Bulbophyllum hodgsonii =

Scientific classification
- Kingdom: Plantae
- Clade: Tracheophytes
- Clade: Angiosperms
- Clade: Monocots
- Order: Asparagales
- Family: Orchidaceae
- Subfamily: Epidendroideae
- Genus: Bulbophyllum
- Species: B. hodgsonii

Binomial name
- Bulbophyllum hodgsonii M.R.Hend.

Species of orchid

Bulbophyllum hodgsonii is a species of orchid in the family Orchidaceae.
