= Bulbophyllum menghaiense =

Scientific classification
- Kingdom: Plantae
- Clade: Tracheophytes
- Clade: Angiosperms
- Clade: Monocots
- Order: Asparagales
- Family: Orchidaceae
- Subfamily: Epidendroideae
- Genus: Bulbophyllum
- Species: B. menghaiense

Binomial name
- Bulbophyllum menghaiense Z. H. Tsi

Species of orchid

Bulbophyllum menghaiense is a species of orchid in the genus Bulbophyllum. This species is native to South-Central China.
