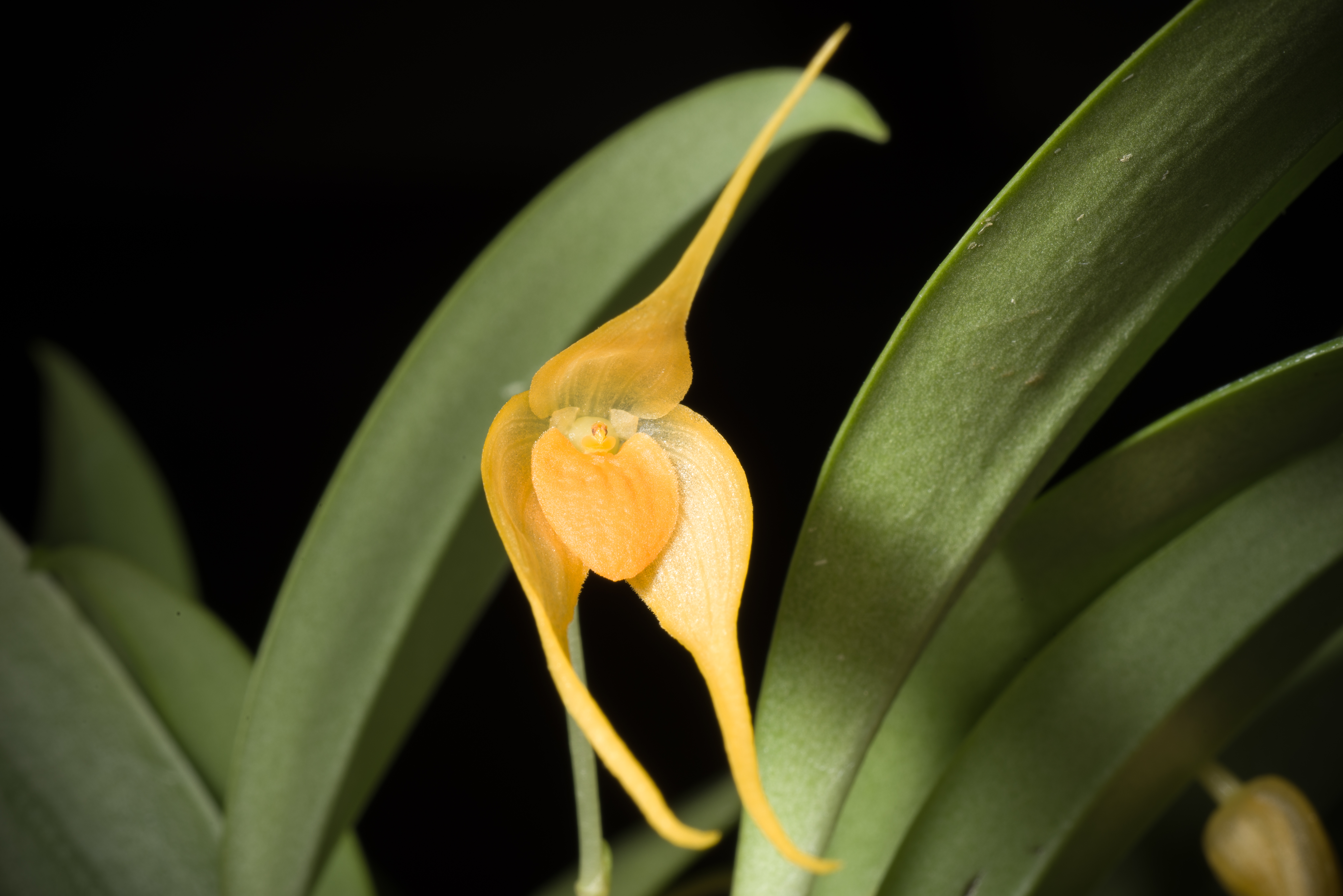

Scientific classification
- Kingdom: Plantae
- Clade: Tracheophytes
- Clade: Angiosperms
- Clade: Monocots
- Order: Asparagales
- Family: Orchidaceae
- Subfamily: Epidendroideae
- Genus: Bulbophyllum
- Species: B. ankylochele

Binomial name
- Bulbophyllum ankylochele J.J.Verm.

Synonyms
- Peltopus ankylochele (J.J.Verm.) Szlach. and Marg.

= Bulbophyllum ankylochele =

Species of orchid

Bulbophyllum ankylochele is a species of orchid in the genus Bulbophyllum. This orchid species is native to the New Guinea and is known for its small size and beautiful, intricate flowers. The scientific name "ankylochele" comes from the Greek words "ankylos," meaning "bent," and "cheilos," meaning "lip," referring to the lip of the flower that is bent downwards.
