= Bulbophyllum algidum =

Scientific classification
- Kingdom: Plantae
- Clade: Tracheophytes
- Clade: Angiosperms
- Clade: Monocots
- Order: Asparagales
- Family: Orchidaceae
- Subfamily: Epidendroideae
- Genus: Bulbophyllum
- Species: B. algidum

Binomial name
- Bulbophyllum algidum Ridl.

Species of orchid from New Guinea

Bulbophyllum algidum is a species of orchid in the genus Bulbophyllum discovered in former British New Guinea by the Wollaston Expedition of 1912–1913, led by Sandy Wollaston. The specimen was discovered at a high altitude, between 10,500 and 12,500 feet.
