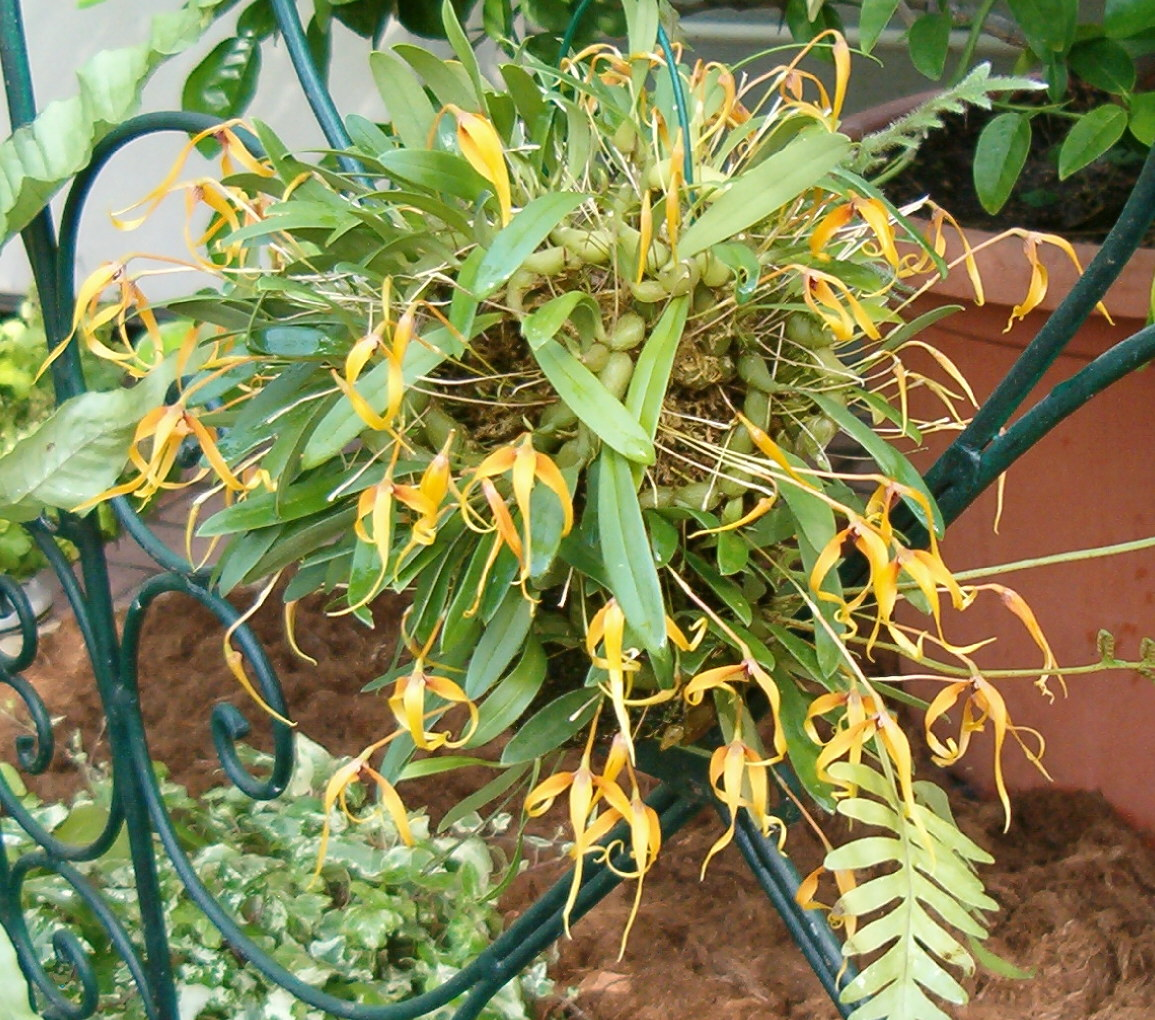

Scientific classification
- Kingdom: Plantae
- Clade: Tracheophytes
- Clade: Angiosperms
- Clade: Monocots
- Order: Asparagales
- Family: Orchidaceae
- Subfamily: Epidendroideae
- Genus: Bulbophyllum
- Species: B. inaequale

Binomial name
- Bulbophyllum inaequale (Blume) Lindl. (1830)

Synonyms
- Diphyes inaequalis Blume (1825) (Basionym); Phyllorkis inaequalis (Blume) Kuntze (1891)

= Bulbophyllum inaequale =

Species of orchid

Bulbophyllum inaequale is a species of orchid.
