= Bulbophyllum montense =

Scientific classification
- Kingdom: Plantae
- Clade: Tracheophytes
- Clade: Angiosperms
- Clade: Monocots
- Order: Asparagales
- Family: Orchidaceae
- Subfamily: Epidendroideae
- Genus: Bulbophyllum
- Species: B. montense

Binomial name
- Bulbophyllum montense Ridl.

Synonyms
- Bulbophyllum vinculibulbum Ames & C. Schweinf. 1920

Species of orchid

Bulbophyllum montense is a species of orchid in the genus Bulbophyllum found in Borneo.

== Description ==
Plant are epiphytic growing from creeping rhizomes. Pseudobulbs are ovoid to ellipsoid, 14 mm x 5 mm. Leaves are elliptic, 60 mm x 7 mm. Plants bloom on an inflorescence with a single orange yellow flower with a dorsal sepal elliptic to ovate 11.5 mm x 2.5 mm, lateral sepals elliptic to obovate 14 mm x 3.5 mm with 5 veined, petals obovate 2.5 mm x 1.0 mm, lip squarish, recurved, abaxial surface glabrous. Column 2 mm long.
