= Jaap J. Vermeulen =

Dutch botanist

Jaap J. Vermeulen (born 1955) is a Dutch botanist, specializing in the Orchidaceae genus Bulbophyllum. Originally a scholar of geology and paleontology, he studied for his PhD in plant taxonomy at the University of Leiden. He has worked at the Singapore Botanic Gardens as a senior research officer and at the National Herbarium of the Netherlands.

== Publications by Jaap Vermeulen ==
=== Books ===
- Bulbophyllum of Sulawesi
- Orchids of Borneo Volume 2 Bulbophyllum
- Bulbophyllum of Borneo
