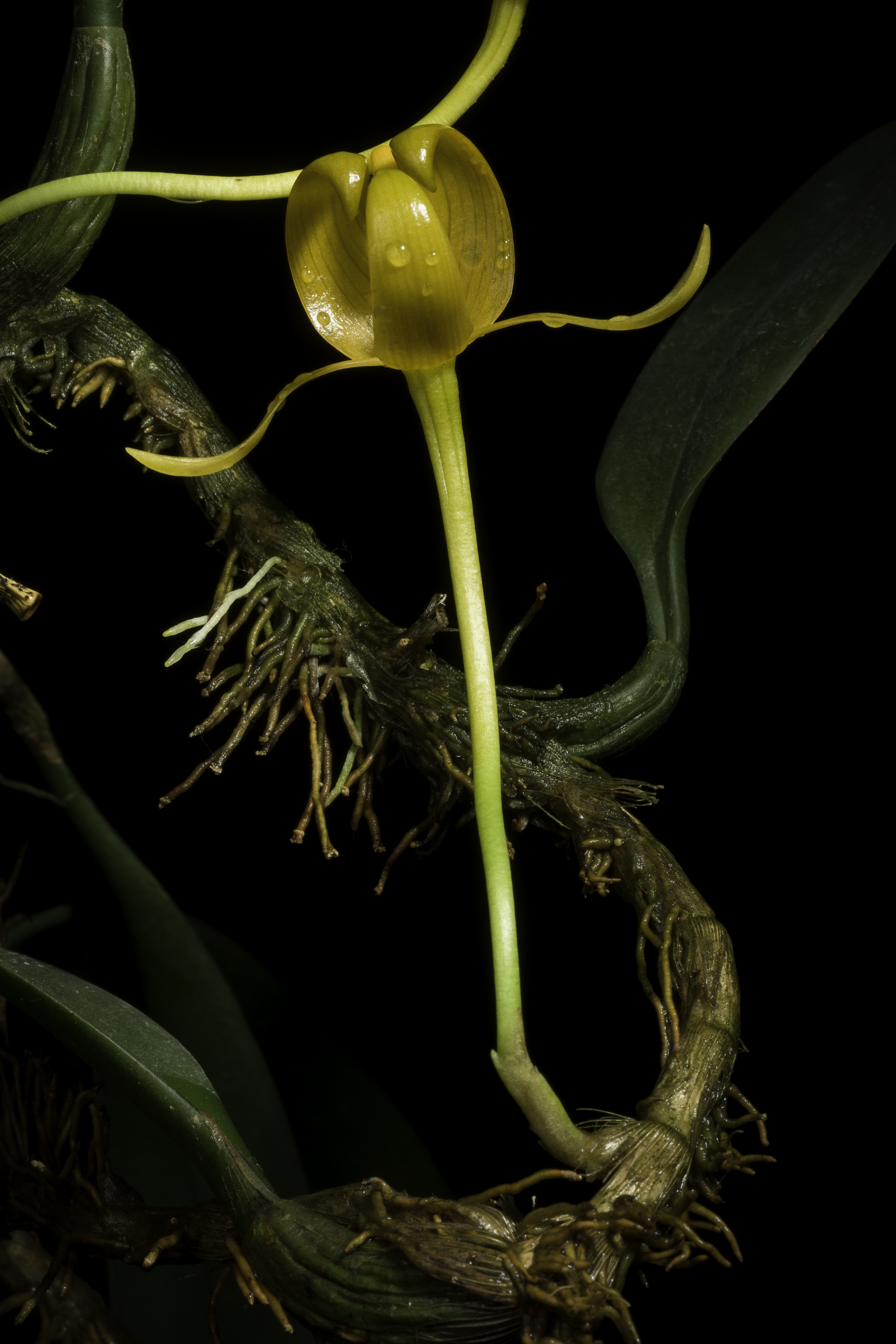
- Bulbophyllum tollenoniferum

Scientific classification
- Kingdom: Plantae
- Clade: Tracheophytes
- Clade: Angiosperms
- Clade: Monocots
- Order: Asparagales
- Family: Orchidaceae
- Subfamily: Epidendroideae
- Genus: Bulbophyllum
- Section: Bulbophyllum sect. Sestochilos (Breda) Benth. & Hook. f. 1883

Type species
- Bulbophyllum lobbii

Species
- See text

Synonyms
- Carparomorchis Clements and Jones 2002; Stenochilus J.J.Sm. 1914

= Bulbophyllum sect. Sestochilos =

Section of flowering plants

Bulbophyllum sect. Sestochilos is a section of the genus Bulbophyllum.

== Description ==
Species in this section have distinct pseudobulbs giving rise to a single flowered inflorescence. Species are pollinated by fruit flies in the genus Bactrocera.

== Distribution ==
Plants from this section are found in Southeast Asia.

== Species ==
Bulbophyllum section Sestochilos comprises the following species:

Image	Name	Distribution	Elevation (m)
	Bulbophyllum affine Lindley 1832	Assam, Nepal, Bhutan, Sikkim, Myanmar, Thailand, Laos, China (Guangdong, Guangxi, Hainan, Yunnan, Hong Kong) Vietnam, Taiwan	100–1,800 metres (330–5,910 ft)
	Bulbophyllum anaclastum J.J.Verm 1993	Sabah Borneo	1,700–1,900 metres (5,600–6,200 ft)
	Bulbophyllum anceps Rolfe 1892	Borneo	0–300 metres (0–984 ft)
	Bulbophyllum apheles J.J.Verm. 1991	Sabah Borneo	1,300–1,700 metres (4,300–5,600 ft)
	Bulbophyllum baileyi F Muell. 1875	Queensland Australia and New Guinea	5–1,000 metres (16–3,281 ft)
	Bulbophyllum breimerianum J.J.Verm. & A.Vogel 2007	Borneo	200–300 metres (660–980 ft)
	Bulbophyllum cameronense Garay, Hamer, & Siegrist 1996	Malaysia	
	Bulbophyllum capillipes C.S.P.Parish & Rchb.f. 1874	Assam, Thailand and Myanmar	
	Bulbophyllum catillus J.J.Verm. & P.O'Byrne 2003	Papua New Guinea	0 metres (0 ft)
	Bulbophyllum cheiri Lindl. 1844	the Philippines	0–500 metres (0–1,640 ft)
	Bulbophyllum claptonense Rolfe 1905	Borneo	800–1,000 metres (2,600–3,300 ft)
	Bulbophyllum coweniorum J.J.Verm. & P.O'Byrne 2003	Laos, Vietnam	800–1,500 metres (2,600–4,900 ft)
	Bulbophyllum dearei Rchb. f. 1888	Borneo, peninsular Malaysia, the Philippines	700–1,200 metres (2,300–3,900 ft)
	Bulbophyllum evansii M.R. Hend. 1927	Malaysia	2,000 metres (6,600 ft)
	Bulbophyllum facetum Garay 1997	The Philippines	1,200 metres (3,900 ft)
	Bulbophyllum fallacinum J.J.Verm. 2008	Papua New Guinea	
	Bulbophyllum gerlandianum Kraenzl. 1886	New Guinea and the Philippines	250–1,100 metres (820–3,610 ft)
	Bulbophyllum gjellerupii J.J.Sm. 1929	New Guinea	60–160 metres (200–520 ft)
	Bulbophyllum grandifolium Schltr.1913	New Guinea	200–500 metres (660–1,640 ft)
	Bulbophyllum hahlianum Schltr. 1905	Papua and New Guinea, the Moluccas and Sulawesi	
	Bulbophyllum hamatipes J.J. Sm. 1918	Java	
	Bulbophyllum hiepii Aver. 1992	Vietnam	100–1,200 metres (330–3,940 ft)
	Bulbophyllum hortorum J J Verm, O'Byrne and Lamb 2015	Sarawak Borneo	240 metres (790 ft)
	Bulbophyllum hyalosemoides Verm & O'Byrne 2011	Borneo and Sulawesi	1,100–1,400 metres (3,600–4,600 ft)
	Bulbophyllum jiewhoei J.J.Verm. & P.O'Byrne 2000	Borneo	
	Bulbophyllum lobbii Lindley 1847	Assam to Thailand, Myanmar, Laos, Cambodia, peninsular Malaysia, Indonesia	200–2,000 metres (660–6,560 ft)
	Bulbophyllum lyriforme J.J.Verm. & P.O'Byrne 2003	Papua New Guinea	
	Bulbophyllum macranthoides Kraenzl. 1904	Papua and New Guinea	0–460 metres (0–1,509 ft)
	Bulbophyllum macranthum Lindley 1844	Assam, Myanmar, Thailand, Malaysia, Vietnam, Borneo, Java, Moluccas, the Philippines, Sulawesi, Sumatra, Papua New Guinea and the Solomon Islands	700–1,500 metres (2,300–4,900 ft)
	Bulbophyllum megalanthum Griff. 1851	peninsular Malaysia, the Moluccas and the Philippines	550 metres (1,800 ft)
	Bulbophyllum microglossum Ridl. 1908	Thailand, Malaysia and Borneo	900–2,200 metres (3,000–7,200 ft)
	Bulbophyllum monanthos Ridl. 1897	Thailand	
	Bulbophyllum orectopetalum Garay, Hamer & Siegerist 1992	Thailand, Myanmar and Cambodia Solomon Islands, New Caledonia, Tonga, Fiji and Samoa	
	Bulbophyllum palawanense Garay 2018	Philippines	
	Bulbophyllum patens King 1896	India, Thailand, Malaysia, Sumatra and Borneo	0–200 metres (0–656 ft)
	Bulbophyllum phaeanthum Schltr. 1911	Sumatra	1,300 metres (4,300 ft)
	Bulbophyllum piestoglossum Verm 1994	Philippines	600–1,300 metres (2,000–4,300 ft)
	Bulbophyllum pileatum Lindl. 1844	Malaysia, Borneo and Sumatra	0–1,000 metres (0–3,281 ft)
	Bulbophyllum praetervisum J.J.Verm. 2002	Borneo	600–1,500 metres (2,000–4,900 ft)
	Bulbophyllum pteroglossum Schltr. 1919	Bhutan, Myanmar, Thailand, southern China and Vietnam	1,000–2,500 metres (3,300–8,200 ft)
	Bulbophyllum santosii Ames 1915	Philippines	800 metres (2,600 ft)
	Bulbophyllum schaiblei Cootes & Naive 2017	Philippines (Luzon)	1,200 metres (3,900 ft)
	Bulbophyllum sillemianum Rchb.f. 1884	Myanmar	
	Bulbophyllum sinapis J.J.Verm. & P.O'Byrne 2003	Papua New Guinea	
	Bulbophyllum smitinandii Seidenf. & Thorut 1996	Thailand and Vietnam	
	Bulbophyllum spectabile Rolfe 1898	India, China, Thailand and Myanmar	
	Bulbophyllum stockeri J.J.Verm. 2008	Papua New Guinea	
	Bulbophyllum thecanthum J.J.Verm. 2008	Indonesia	
	Bulbophyllum tollenoniferum J.J. Sm. 1912	Papua New Guinea	40–1,200 metres (130–3,940 ft)
	Bulbophyllum tortum Schltr. 1913	Papua New Guinea	150–500 metres (490–1,640 ft)
	Bulbophyllum translucidum Kindler, R.Bustam. & Ferreras 2016	Philippines (Samar, Leyte and Agusan)	321 metres (1,053 ft)
	Bulbophyllum veitchianum Garay ex W.E.Higgins 2009	Sulawesi	
	Bulbophyllum werneri Schltr.1913	Papua and New Guinea	100–350 metres (330–1,150 ft)
	Bulbophyllum xyphoglossum J.J.Verm., de Vogel & A.Vogel 2010	Bismarck archipelago	275 metres (902 ft)
