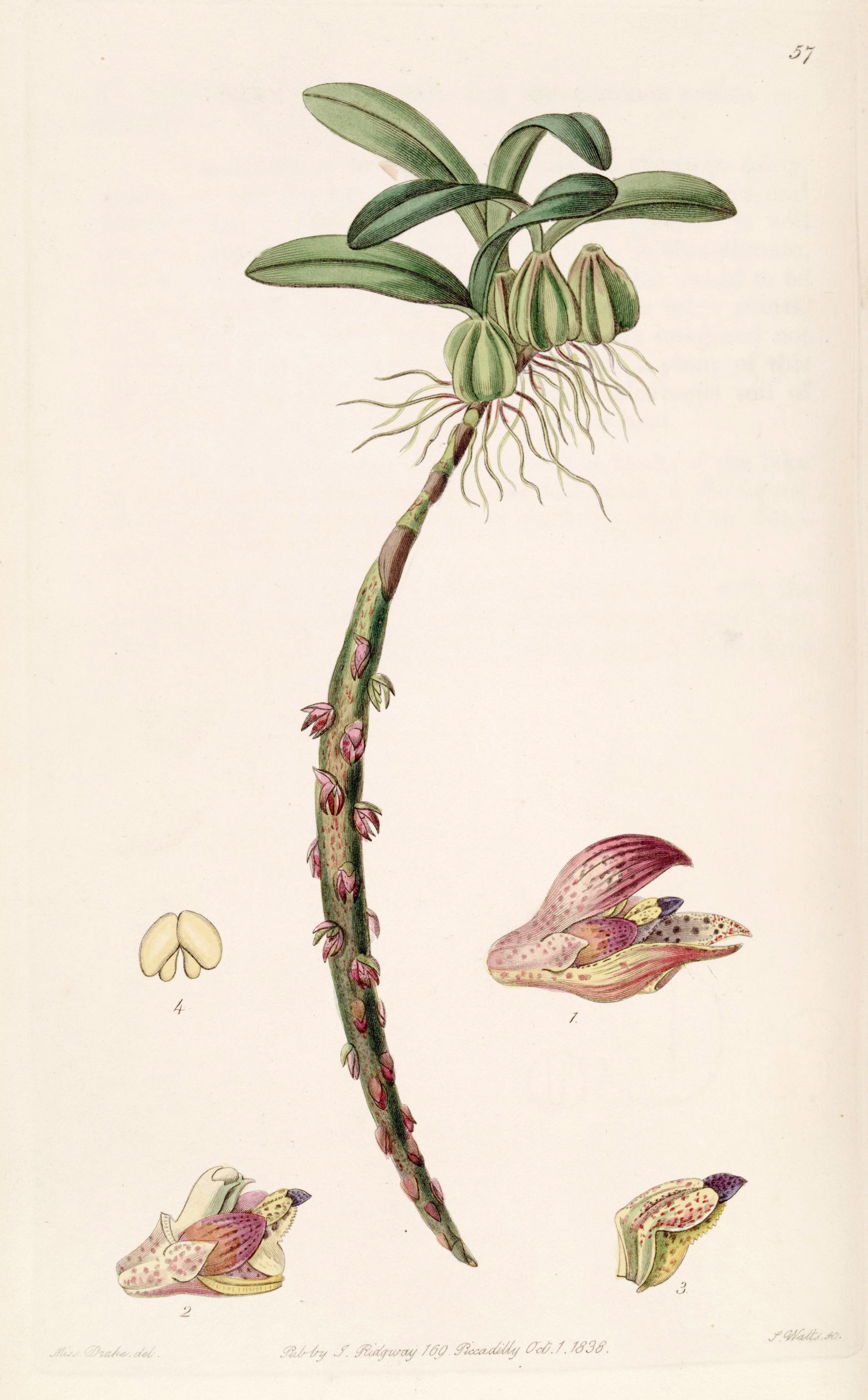
- Bulbophyllum bracteolatum from Edwards's Botanical Register, volume 24 (1838)

Scientific classification
- Kingdom: Plantae
- Clade: Tracheophytes
- Clade: Angiosperms
- Clade: Monocots
- Order: Asparagales
- Family: Orchidaceae
- Subfamily: Epidendroideae
- Genus: Bulbophyllum
- Section: Bulbophyllum sect. Bulbophyllaria [Rchb.f] Griseb. 1864

Type species
- Bulbophyllum bracteolatum

Species
- See text

= Bulbophyllum sect. Bulbophyllaria =

Section of flowering plants

Bulbophyllum sect. Bulbophyllaria is a section of the genus Bulbophyllum. It is one of six Bulbophyllum sections found in the Americas.

== Description ==
Species in this section have bifoliate pseudobulbs, inflorescence with fleshy a rachis holding flowers that are spirally arranged. Lateral sepals totally free, petals erect. Column foot with entire apex and shorter than the length of the column.

== Distribution ==
Plants from this section are found in Central America through Venezuela, Bolivia and Brazil.

== Species ==
Bulbophyllum section Bulbophyllaria comprises the following species:

Image	Name	Distribution	Elevation (m)
	Bulbophyllum aristatum (Rchb.f.) Hemsl. 1884	Mexico, Guatemala, Belize, Honduras, El Salvador, Nicaragua, Costa Rica, Panama, Cuba, Haiti, Dominican Republic and Venezuela	55–1,500 metres (180–4,921 ft)
	Bulbophyllum bracteolatum Lindl. 1838	French Guiana, Suriname, Venezuela, Bolivia and Brazil	600 metres (2,000 ft)
	Bulbophyllum cirrhosum L.O.Williams 1940	Mexico	1,400–1,600 metres (4,600–5,200 ft)
	Bulbophyllum kegelii Hamer & Garay 1995 publ. 1997	Trinidad to Brazil	
	Bulbophyllum oerstedii (Rchb.f.) Hemsl. 1884	Colombia, southern Venezuela, Guyana and northern Brazil	50–500 metres (160–1,640 ft)
	Bulbophyllum pinelianum (A.Rich.) Paul Abel Ormerod 2016	Florida, the Caribbean, all of Central America as well as Mexico, Venezuela, Colombia, Ecuador and Bolivia	0–1,000 metres (0–3,281 ft)
	Bulbophyllum sordidum Lindl. 1840	Guatemala, Costa Rica, Panama, Colombia and Ecuador	
	Bulbophyllum wagneri Schltr. 1921	Panama to Ecuador	
