= Bulbophyllum sect. Genyorchis =

Scientific classification
- Kingdom: Plantae
- Clade: Tracheophytes
- Clade: Angiosperms
- Clade: Monocots
- Order: Asparagales
- Family: Orchidaceae
- Subfamily: Epidendroideae
- Genus: Bulbophyllum
- Section: Bulbophyllum sect. Genyorchis; G.A. Fischer & J.J. Verm. ex J.J. Verm. 2014

Type species
- Bulbophyllum apetalum

Species
- See text

Synonyms
- Genyorchis Schltr. 1910

Section of flowering plants

Bulbophyllum sect. Genyorchis is a section of the genus Bulbophyllum.

== Description ==
Species in this section have lip attached to column foot by a strip of tissue.

== Distribution ==
Plants from this section are found in Cameroon, Congo, Ghana, Nigeria, Ivory Coast, Sierra Leone, and Zaire.

== Species ==
Bulbophyllum section Genyorchis comprises the following species:

Image	Name	Distribution	Elevation (m)
	Bulbophyllum apertiflorum (Summerh.) Govaerts & J.M.H.Shaw 2018	Nigeria	900 metres (3,000 ft)
	Bulbophyllum apetalum Lindl. 1862	Nigeria, Ivory Coast, Sierra Leone, Ghana, Cameroon, Gabon, Gulf of Guinea Islands, Congo, Zaire	0–1,400 metres (0–4,593 ft)
	Bulbophyllum deshmukhii U.B.Deshmukh & J.M.H.Shaw 2022	Cameroon	
	Bulbophyllum excavatum Govaerts & J.M.H.Shaw 2018	Equatorial Guinea	
	Bulbophyllum micropetalum Lindl. 1862	Cameroon to Congo	1,330–1,650 metres (4,360–5,410 ft)
	Bulbophyllum paulae Govaerts & J.M.H.Shaw 2018	Congo	
	Bulbophyllum platybulbum (Schltr.) Govaerts & J.M.H.Shaw 2018	Cameroon to Gabon	0–800 metres (0–2,625 ft)
	Bulbophyllum pumilum (Sw.) Lindl. 1830	Ghana, Ivory Coast, Liberia, Nigeria, Central African Republic, Gabon, Zaire and Uganda	0–500 metres (0–1,640 ft)
	Bulbophyllum sanfordii (Szlach. & Olszewski) Govaerts & J.M.H.Shaw 2018	Cameroon, Congo, Equatorial Guinea, Gabon	100–770 metres (330–2,530 ft)
	Bulbophyllum summerhayesianum (Szlach. & Olszewski) Govaerts & J.M.H.Shaw 2018	Nigeria	
