= Bulbophyllum bandischii =

Scientific classification
- Kingdom: Plantae
- Clade: Tracheophytes
- Clade: Angiosperms
- Clade: Monocots
- Order: Asparagales
- Family: Orchidaceae
- Subfamily: Epidendroideae
- Genus: Bulbophyllum
- Section: Bulbophyllum sect. Hyalosema
- Species: B. bandischii

Binomial name
- Bulbophyllum bandischii Garay, Hamer & Siegerist

Synonyms
- Hyalosema bandischii (Garay, Hamer & Siegerist) Rysy

Species of orchid

Bulbophyllum bandischii is a species of flowering plant in the family Orchidaceae.
