= Bulbophyllum schmidii =

Scientific classification
- Kingdom: Plantae
- Clade: Tracheophytes
- Clade: Angiosperms
- Clade: Monocots
- Order: Asparagales
- Family: Orchidaceae
- Subfamily: Epidendroideae
- Genus: Bulbophyllum
- Section: Bulbophyllum sect. Hyalosema
- Species: B. schmidii

Binomial name
- Bulbophyllum schmidii Garay

Synonyms
- Hyalosema schmidii (Garay) Rysy 2002

Species of orchid

Bulbophyllum schmidii is a species of flowering plant in the family Orchidaceae.
