= Bulbophyllum kermesinum =

Scientific classification
- Kingdom: Plantae
- Clade: Tracheophytes
- Clade: Angiosperms
- Clade: Monocots
- Order: Asparagales
- Family: Orchidaceae
- Subfamily: Epidendroideae
- Genus: Bulbophyllum
- Section: Bulbophyllum sect. Hyalosema
- Species: B. kermesinum

Binomial name
- Bulbophyllum kermesinum Ridl.

Synonyms
- Hapalochilus kermesinus (Ridl.) Garay & W.Kittr. 1985 publ. 1986

Species of orchid

Bulbophyllum kermesinum is a species of orchid in the genus Bulbophyllum.
