= Bulbophyllum biantennatum =

Scientific classification
- Kingdom: Plantae
- Clade: Tracheophytes
- Clade: Angiosperms
- Clade: Monocots
- Order: Asparagales
- Family: Orchidaceae
- Subfamily: Epidendroideae
- Genus: Bulbophyllum
- Section: Bulbophyllum sect. Hyalosema
- Species: B. biantennatum

Binomial name
- Bulbophyllum biantennatum Schltr.

Synonyms
- Hyalosema biantennatum (Schltr.) Rolfe 1919

Species of orchid

Bulbophyllum biantennatum is a species of orchid in the genus Bulbophyllum.
