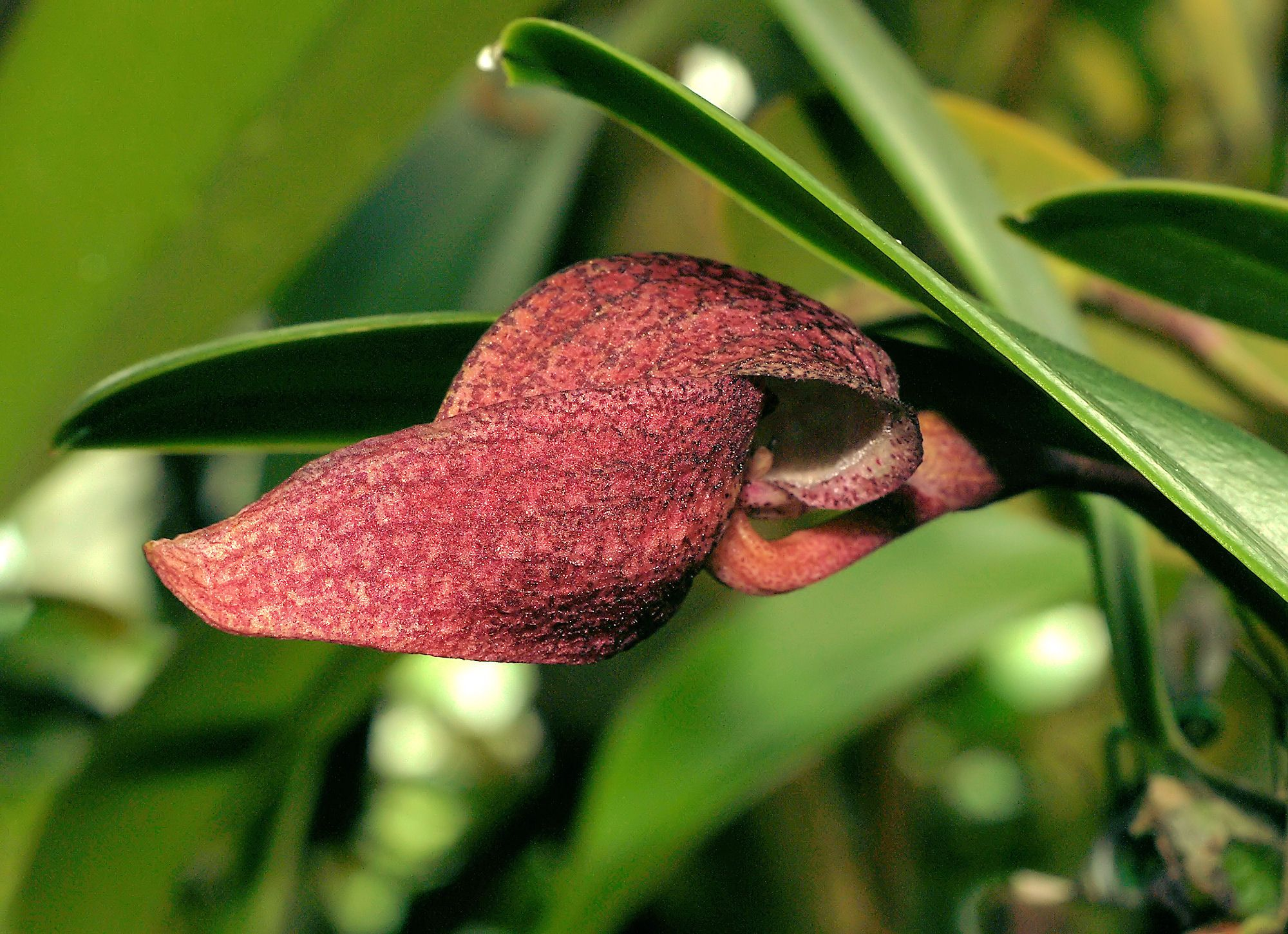

Scientific classification
- Kingdom: Plantae
- Clade: Tracheophytes
- Clade: Angiosperms
- Clade: Monocots
- Order: Asparagales
- Family: Orchidaceae
- Subfamily: Epidendroideae
- Genus: Bulbophyllum
- Section: Bulbophyllum sect. Hyalosema
- Species: B. arfakianum

Binomial name
- Bulbophyllum arfakianum Kraenzl.

Synonyms
- Hyalosema arfakianum (Kraenzl.) Rysy 2002; Bulbophyllum fraudulentum Garay, Hamer & Siegerist 1996; Hyalosema fraudulentum (Garay, Hamer & Siegerist) Rysy 2002

= Bulbophyllum arfakianum =

Species of orchid from New Guinea

Bulbophyllum arfakianum is a species of orchid in the genus Bulbophyllum. This rare orchid is endemic to Arfak Mountains at elevations 50~400 meters in rainforests, Papua New Guinea.

== Description ==
The species is slow-growing epiphyte with an ascending growth habit. Its pseudobulbs are ovoid, 1-leafed at the apex, spaced of about 2.5 cm on a creeping rhizome. Leaves are oblong, dark green, 4.5~9 cm long. Inflorescence is from the base of the pseudobulb and single-flowered, 14 cm long. Flowers are 5 cm long with a dorsal sepal with pointed apex bent forward. lateral sepals are falcate, converging at the apex. Flowers are colored with maroon macules.
