= Bulbophyllum tricanaliferum =

Scientific classification
- Kingdom: Plantae
- Clade: Tracheophytes
- Clade: Angiosperms
- Clade: Monocots
- Order: Asparagales
- Family: Orchidaceae
- Subfamily: Epidendroideae
- Genus: Bulbophyllum
- Section: Bulbophyllum sect. Hyalosema
- Species: B. tricanaliferum

Binomial name
- Bulbophyllum tricanaliferum J. J. Sm.

Synonyms
- Hyalosema tricanaliferum (J.J.Sm.) Rolfe 1919

Species of orchid

Bulbophyllum tricanaliferum is a species of orchid in the genus Bulbophyllum.
