= Bulbophyllum fritillariiflorum =

Scientific classification
- Kingdom: Plantae
- Clade: Tracheophytes
- Clade: Angiosperms
- Clade: Monocots
- Order: Asparagales
- Family: Orchidaceae
- Subfamily: Epidendroideae
- Genus: Bulbophyllum
- Section: Bulbophyllum sect. Hyalosema
- Species: B. fritillariiflorum

Binomial name
- Bulbophyllum fritillariiflorum J.J.Sm.

Synonyms
- Hyalosema fritillariiflorum (J.J.Sm.) Rolfe (1919)

Species of orchid

Bulbophyllum fritillariiflorum is a species of orchid in the genus Bulbophyllum. It is a pseudobulbous epiphyte endemic to New Guinea.
