= Bulbophyllum trachyanthum =

Scientific classification
- Kingdom: Plantae
- Clade: Tracheophytes
- Clade: Angiosperms
- Clade: Monocots
- Order: Asparagales
- Family: Orchidaceae
- Subfamily: Epidendroideae
- Genus: Bulbophyllum
- Section: Bulbophyllum sect. Hyalosema
- Species: B. trachyanthum

Binomial name
- Bulbophyllum trachyanthum Kraenzl.

Synonyms
- Hyalosema trachyanthum (Kraenzl.) Rolfe 1919; Bulbophyllum klossii Ridl. 1916; Hyalosema klossii (Ridl.) Rolfe 1919

Species of orchid

Bulbophyllum trachyanthum is a species of orchid in the genus Bulbophyllum.
