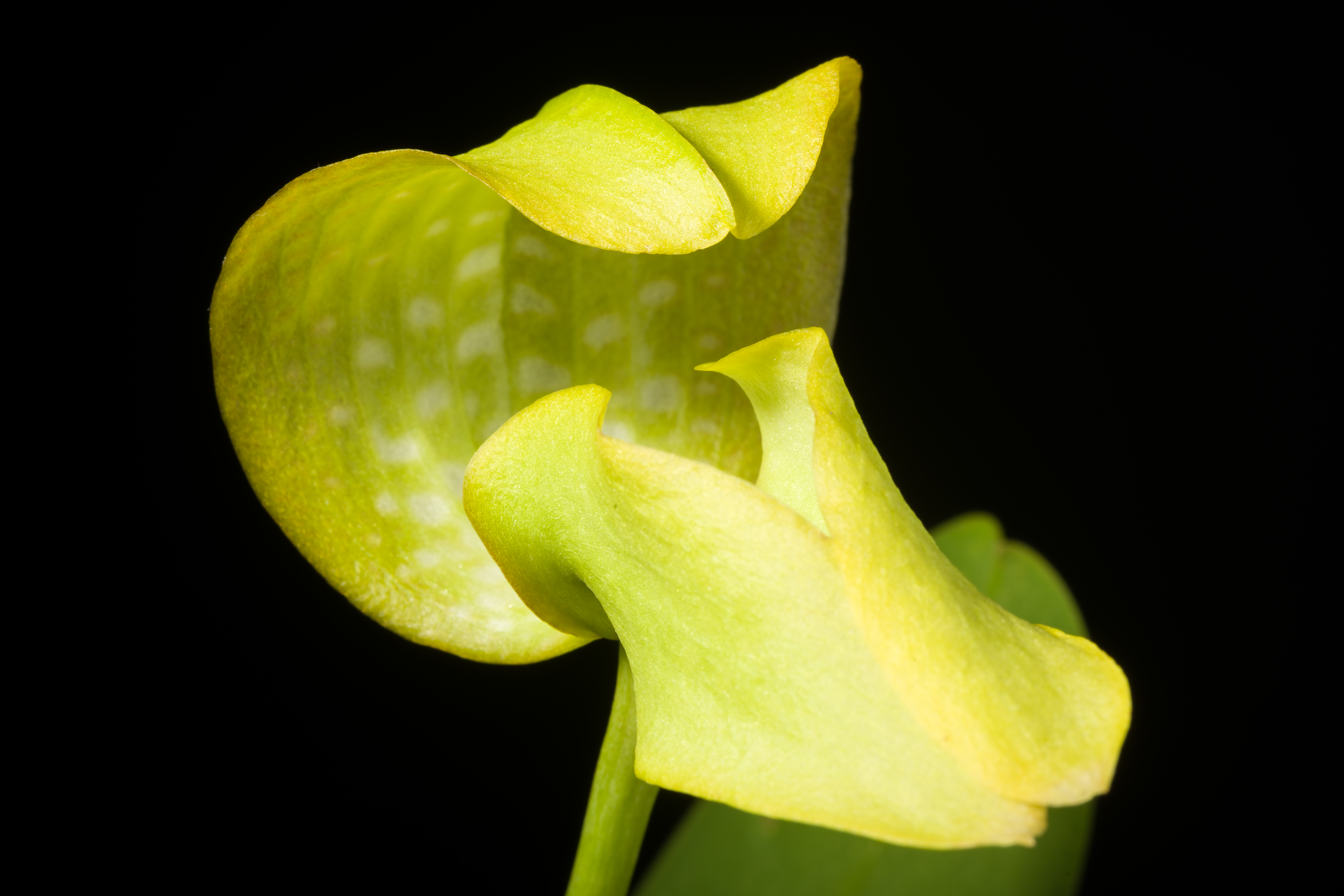

Scientific classification
- Kingdom: Plantae
- Clade: Tracheophytes
- Clade: Angiosperms
- Clade: Monocots
- Order: Asparagales
- Family: Orchidaceae
- Subfamily: Epidendroideae
- Genus: Bulbophyllum
- Section: Bulbophyllum sect. Hyalosema
- Species: B. grandiflorum

Binomial name
- Bulbophyllum grandiflorum Blume (1849)

Synonyms
- Ephippium grandiflorum Blume (1849); Sarcopodium grandiflorum (Blume) Lindl. (1853); Phyllorkis grandiflora (Blume) Kuntze (1891); Bulbophyllum cominsii Rolfe (1898); Bulbophyllum micholitzii Rolfe 1901; Bulbophyllum burfordiense Hook.f. (1901); Hyalosema grandiflorum (Blume) Rolfe (1919); Hyalosema cominsii (Rolfe) Rolfe (1919)

= Bulbophyllum grandiflorum =

Species of orchid

Bulbophyllum grandiflorum is a species of orchid found in the Solomon Islands and Papua New Guinea.
