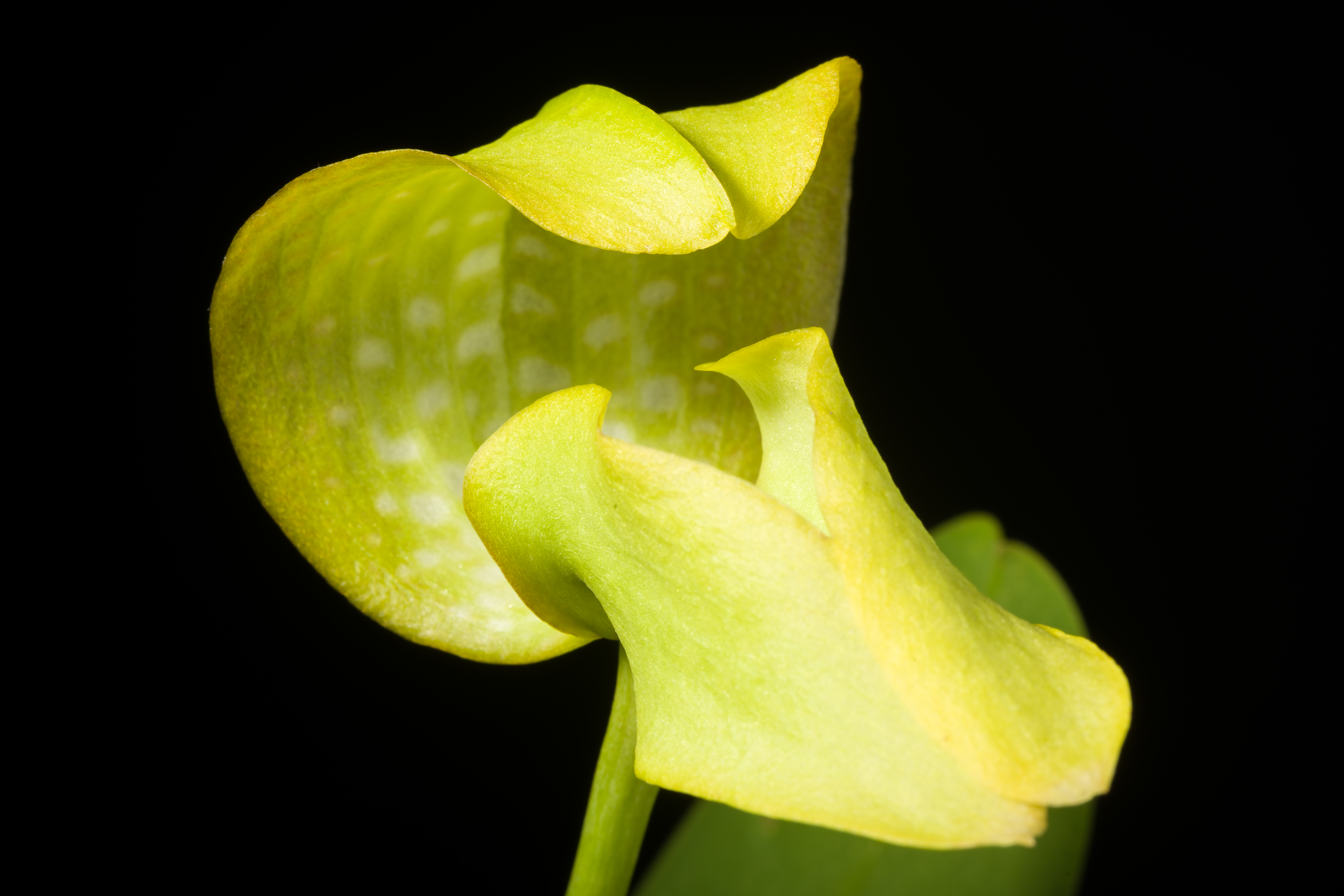
- Bulbophyllum grandiflorum fma. aureum 'Shining Fuji'

Scientific classification
- Kingdom: Plantae
- Clade: Tracheophytes
- Clade: Angiosperms
- Clade: Monocots
- Order: Asparagales
- Family: Orchidaceae
- Subfamily: Epidendroideae
- Genus: Bulbophyllum
- Section: Bulbophyllum sect. Hyalosema; Schlechter 1911

Type species
- Bulbophyllum grandiflorum

Species
- See text

= Bulbophyllum sect. Hyalosema =

Subgenus of flowering plants

Bulbophyllum sect. Hyalosema is a section of the genus Bulbophyllum.

== Description ==
Plants in this section are characterized by having distinct pseudobulbs with new growths sprouting from the basal node and not from fused pseudobulbs, usually bearing a single flower with tubular floral bracts, with a stalk from the basal node, free sepals or the lateral one connate along the lower margin, which is equal to or slightly shorter than the medians, caudate obtuse, margins entire, glabrous to papillose to bristly, and usually 5-veined. Petals obtuse to caudate, nucleus caudate, tip often thick, globular ellipsoid-cylindrical, appendage, margins entire, glabrous, usually 3-veined. The lip is mobile in a fine ligament, undivided, margins entire, glabrous to papillose to ciliate, often concave adaxially near the base and without ridges, surfaces glabrous to hirsute parts. It has 4 pollinia. The type species is Bulbophyllum grandiflorum Blume 1847

== Distribution ==
Plants from this section are found in Southeast Asia.

== Species ==
Bulbophyllum section Hyalosema comprises the following species:

Image	Name	Distribution	Elevation (m)
	Bulbophyllum antenniferum [Lindley] Rchb. f. 1864	Java, Borneo, New Guinea and Philippines.	300–1,500 metres (980–4,920 ft)
	Bulbophyllum arfakianum Kraenzl. 1905	Papúa New Guinea.	50–400 metres (160–1,310 ft)
	Bulbophyllum bandischii Garay, Hamer, Siegerist 1992	New Guinea.	
	Bulbophyllum biantennatum Schltr. 1913	Papúa New Guinea.	600 metres (2,000 ft)
	Bulbophyllum dennisii JJ Madera 1983	New Guinea and Salomon Islands.	
	Bulbophyllum elephantinum J J Sm. 1913	New Guinea.	1,800–1,900 metres (5,900–6,200 ft)
	Bulbophyllum fritillariiflorum JJ Smith 1912	Sumatra, Célebes, the Moluccas and New Guinea.	450 metres (1,480 ft)
	Bulbophyllum grandiflorum Blume 1847	Sumatra, Sulawesi, the Moluccas, and New Guinea	100–800 metres (330–2,620 ft)
	Bulbophyllum kermesinum Ridl. 1886	Southern New Guinea.	
	Bulbophyllum leysianum Burb. 1895	Peninsular Malaysia, Borneo, Java, Vietnam	300–600 metres (980–1,970 ft)
	Bulbophyllum longisepalum Rolfe 1895	Southern New Guinea.	
	Bulbophyllum saronae Garay 1999	Papúa New Guinea.	
	Bulbophyllum schmidii Garay 1999	Irian Jaya.	2,300–2,900 metres (7,500–9,500 ft)
	Bulbophyllum singulare Schltr. 1913	Papúa New Guinea.	300 metres (980 ft)
	Bulbophyllum tentaculatum Schltr. 1913	Papua New Guinea	
	Bulbophyllum trachyanthum Kraenzl. 1894	Papua New Guinea, Solomon Islands, Fiji and Samoa.	2,300–3,000 metres (7,500–9,800 ft)
	Bulbophyllum tricanaliferum JJ Sm. 1913	Papúa New Guinea.	
	Bulbophyllum unitubum JJ Sm. 1929	Indonesia, Papua New Guinea and Borneo.	160–500 metres (520–1,640 ft)
