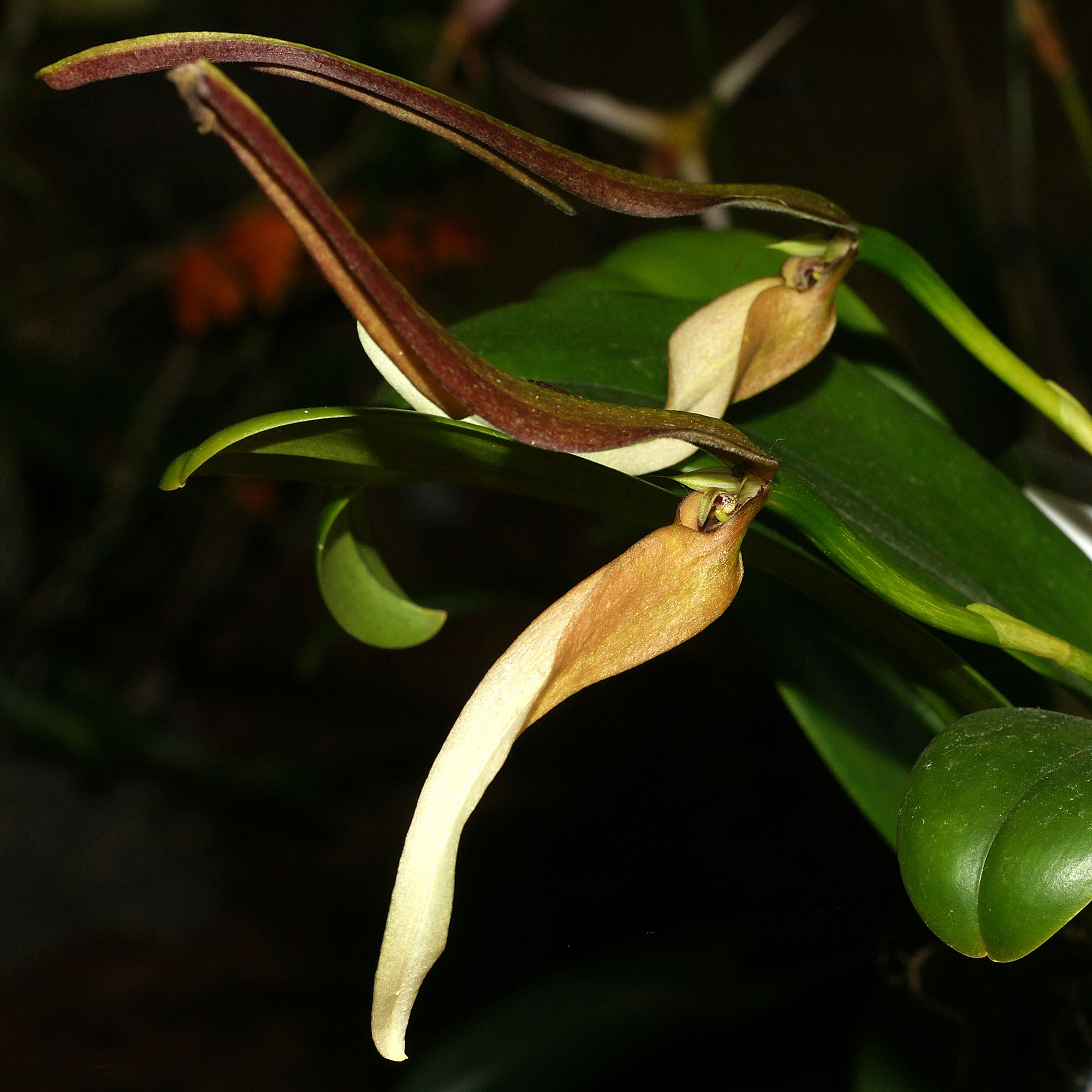

Scientific classification
- Kingdom: Plantae
- Clade: Tracheophytes
- Clade: Angiosperms
- Clade: Monocots
- Order: Asparagales
- Family: Orchidaceae
- Subfamily: Epidendroideae
- Genus: Bulbophyllum
- Section: Bulbophyllum sect. Hyalosema
- Species: B. antenniferum

Binomial name
- Bulbophyllum antenniferum (Lindl.) Rchb.f.

Synonyms
- Cirrhopetalum antenniferum Lindl. 1843; Hyalosema antenniferum (Lindl.) Rysy 2002; Phyllorkis antennifera (Lindl.) Kuntze 1891

= Bulbophyllum antenniferum =

Species of orchid

Bulbophyllum antenniferum is a species of orchid in the genus Bulbophyllum.

== Description ==
Plants have quadrangular pseudobulbs that are 2-5 cm tall with a single leaf that is 10 x 2.5 cm. Plants bloom on an 18 cm long inflorescence surrounded by a basal bract with a single flower that is pale greenish brown. Petals are small with a clavate apex. Lateral sepals are connate, recurved, 5 cm long and fused.

== Distribution ==
Plants are found growing in dapple light on tree trunks and rocks in Thailand, Java, Borneo, New Guinea, Solomon Islands, and the Philippines (Leyte, Mindanao) at elevations of 300–1,500 metres (980–4,920 ft).
