= Bulbophyllum deshmukhii =

Conservation status
- Endangered (IUCN 3.1)

Scientific classification
- Kingdom: Plantae
- Clade: Tracheophytes
- Clade: Angiosperms
- Clade: Monocots
- Order: Asparagales
- Family: Orchidaceae
- Subfamily: Epidendroideae
- Genus: Bulbophyllum
- Species: B. deshmukhii

Binomial name
- Bulbophyllum deshmukhii U.B.Deshmukh & J.M.H.Shaw

Synonyms
- Bulbophyllum macranthum (Summerh.) Govaerts & J.M.H.Shaw, nom. illeg.; Genyorchis macrantha Summerh.

Species of orchid

Bulbophyllum deshmukhii, synonym Genyorchis macrantha, is a species of plant in the family Orchidaceae. It is endemic to Cameroon. Its natural habitat is subtropical or tropical dry forests.

== Taxonomy ==
The species was first described by V. S. Summerhayes in 1957, as Genyorchis macrantha. The genus Genyorchis was later included in Bulbophyllum. Accordingly, in 2018, Rafaël Govaerts and J. M. H. Shaw moved Genyorchis macrantha to Bulbophyllum as Bulbophyllum macranthum. However, this name had already been used in 1844 for Bulbophyllum macranthum Lindl., so the 2018 name was illegitimate. The replacement name Bulbophyllum deshmukhii was published in 2022.
