= Bulbophyllum dennisii =

Scientific classification
- Kingdom: Plantae
- Clade: Tracheophytes
- Clade: Angiosperms
- Clade: Monocots
- Order: Asparagales
- Family: Orchidaceae
- Subfamily: Epidendroideae
- Genus: Bulbophyllum
- Section: Bulbophyllum sect. Hyalosema
- Species: B. dennisii

Binomial name
- Bulbophyllum dennisii J.J.Wood

Synonyms
- Hyalosema dennisii (J.J.Wood) Rysy 2002

Species of orchid

Bulbophyllum dennisii is a species of orchid in the genus Bulbophyllum.
