= Bulbophyllum kegelii =

Scientific classification
- Kingdom: Plantae
- Clade: Tracheophytes
- Clade: Angiosperms
- Clade: Monocots
- Order: Asparagales
- Family: Orchidaceae
- Subfamily: Epidendroideae
- Genus: Bulbophyllum
- Species: B. kegelii

Binomial name
- Bulbophyllum kegelii Hamer & Garay

Species of orchid

Bulbophyllum kegelii is a species of flowering plant in the family Orchidaceae.
