= Bulbophyllum praetervisum =

Scientific classification
- Kingdom: Plantae
- Clade: Tracheophytes
- Clade: Angiosperms
- Clade: Monocots
- Order: Asparagales
- Family: Orchidaceae
- Subfamily: Epidendroideae
- Genus: Bulbophyllum
- Species: B. praetervisum

Binomial name
- Bulbophyllum praetervisum J. J. Verm.

Species of orchid

Bulbophyllum praetervisum is a species of orchid in the genus Bulbophyllum. It grows a single flower on each inflorescence, these flowers are glossy, thick, and fleshy. They exude a spicy fragrance.
