= Bulbophyllum oerstedii =

Scientific classification
- Kingdom: Plantae
- Clade: Tracheophytes
- Clade: Angiosperms
- Clade: Monocots
- Order: Asparagales
- Family: Orchidaceae
- Subfamily: Epidendroideae
- Genus: Bulbophyllum
- Species: B. oerstedii

Binomial name
- Bulbophyllum oerstedii (Rchb.f.) Hemsl. 1884

Species of plant

Bulbophyllum oerstedii is a species of Bulbophyllum found in Colombia, southern Venezuela, Guyana and northern Brazil.
