= Bulbophyllum wagneri =

Scientific classification
- Kingdom: Plantae
- Clade: Tracheophytes
- Clade: Angiosperms
- Clade: Monocots
- Order: Asparagales
- Family: Orchidaceae
- Subfamily: Epidendroideae
- Genus: Bulbophyllum
- Species: B. wagneri

Binomial name
- Bulbophyllum wagneri Schltr. 1921

Species of orchid

Bulbophyllum wagneri is a species of orchid in the genus Bulbophyllum found from Panama to Ecuador.
