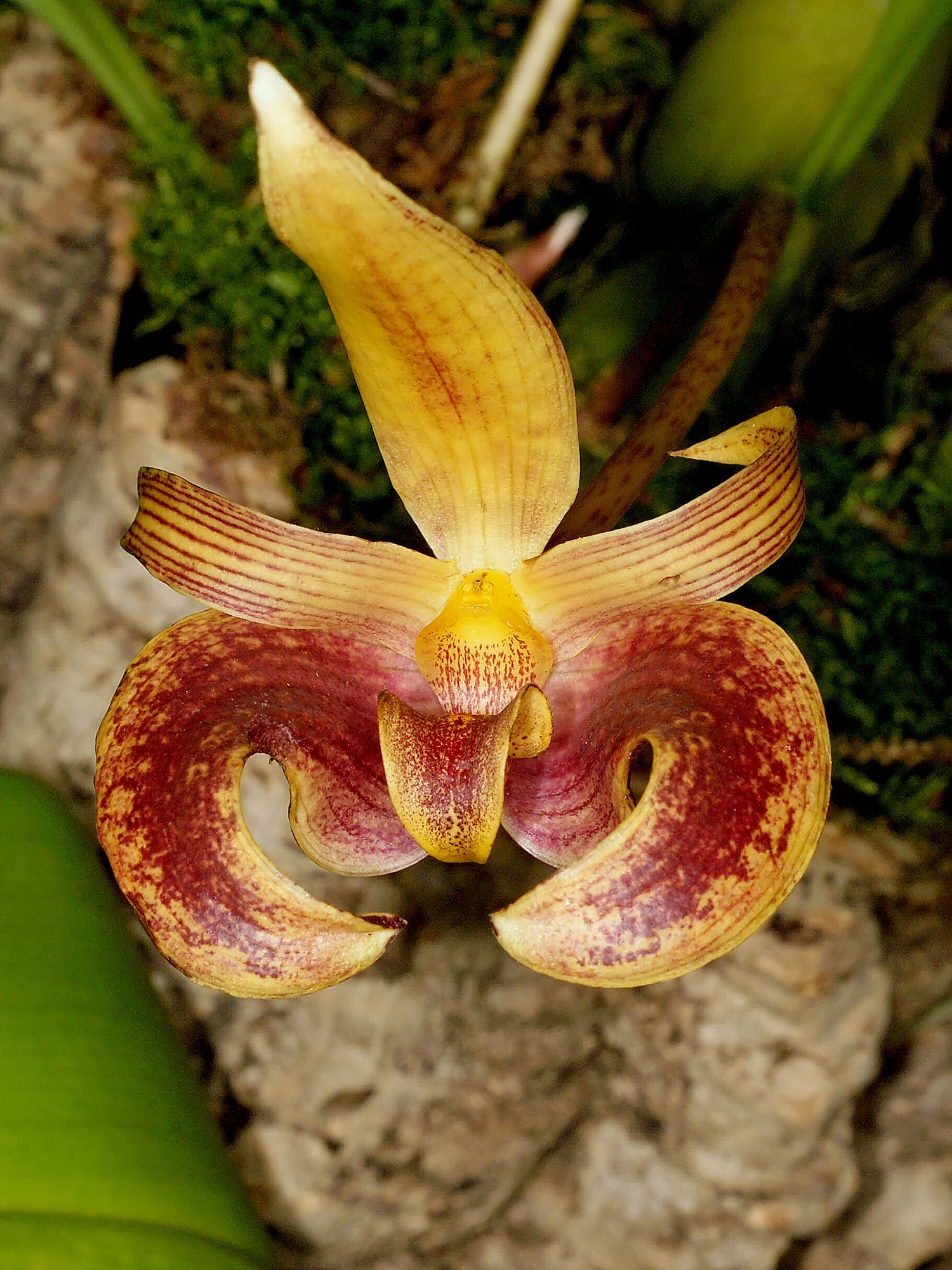

Scientific classification
- Kingdom: Plantae
- Clade: Tracheophytes
- Clade: Angiosperms
- Clade: Monocots
- Order: Asparagales
- Family: Orchidaceae
- Subfamily: Epidendroideae
- Genus: Bulbophyllum
- Species: B. claptonense

Binomial name
- Bulbophyllum claptonense Rolfe 1905

= Bulbophyllum claptonense =

Species of plant

Bulbophyllum claptonense is a species of Bulbophyllum found in Borneo.
