= Bulbophyllum apetalum =

Scientific classification
- Kingdom: Plantae
- Clade: Tracheophytes
- Clade: Angiosperms
- Clade: Monocots
- Order: Asparagales
- Family: Orchidaceae
- Subfamily: Epidendroideae
- Genus: Bulbophyllum
- Species: B. apetalum

Binomial name
- Bulbophyllum apetalum Lindl.

Synonyms
- Genyorchis apetala (Lindl.) J.J.Verm.; Phyllorkis micropetala (Lindl.) Kuntze; Polystachya micropetala (Lindl.) Rolfe in D.Oliver & auct. suc.

Species of orchid

Bulbophyllum apetalum is a species of plant in the family Orchidaceae. It is found in West Tropical Africa to Uganda. It is a pseudobulb epiphyte, and its natural habitat includes tropical rainforests, mangrove swamps, and lowland forests. It was formerly the type species of the genus Genyorchis, which is now synonymous with Bulbophyllum.
