= Bulbophyllum sordidum =

Scientific classification
- Kingdom: Plantae
- Clade: Tracheophytes
- Clade: Angiosperms
- Clade: Monocots
- Order: Asparagales
- Family: Orchidaceae
- Subfamily: Epidendroideae
- Genus: Bulbophyllum
- Species: B. sordidum

Binomial name
- Bulbophyllum sordidum Lindl. 1840

Species of orchid

Bulbophyllum sordidum is a species of orchid in the genus Bulbophyllum found in Guatemala, Costa Rica, Panama, Colombia and Ecuador.
