= Bulbophyllum platybulbum =

Conservation status
- Critically Endangered (IUCN 2.3)

Scientific classification
- Kingdom: Plantae
- Clade: Tracheophytes
- Clade: Angiosperms
- Clade: Monocots
- Order: Asparagales
- Family: Orchidaceae
- Subfamily: Epidendroideae
- Genus: Bulbophyllum
- Species: B. platybulbum

Binomial name
- Bulbophyllum platybulbum (Schltr.) Govaerts & J.M.H.Shaw

Synonyms
- Genyorchis platybulbon Schltr.; Polystachya platybulbon (Schltr.) Kraenzl.

Species of orchid

Bulbophyllum platybulbon is a species of plant in the family Orchidaceae. It is native to Cameroon and Gabon. Its natural habitat is subtropical or tropical dry forests. It is threatened by habitat loss.
