= Bulbophyllum aristatum =

Scientific classification
- Kingdom: Plantae
- Clade: Tracheophytes
- Clade: Angiosperms
- Clade: Monocots
- Order: Asparagales
- Family: Orchidaceae
- Subfamily: Epidendroideae
- Genus: Bulbophyllum
- Species: B. aristatum

Binomial name
- Bulbophyllum aristatum (Rchb.f.) Hemsl. 1884

Species of orchid

Bulbophyllum aristatum is a species of orchid in the genus Bulbophyllum found in Mexico, Guatemala, Belize, Honduras, El Salvador, Nicaragua, Costa Rica, Panama, Cuba, Haiti, Dominican Republic and Venezuela.
