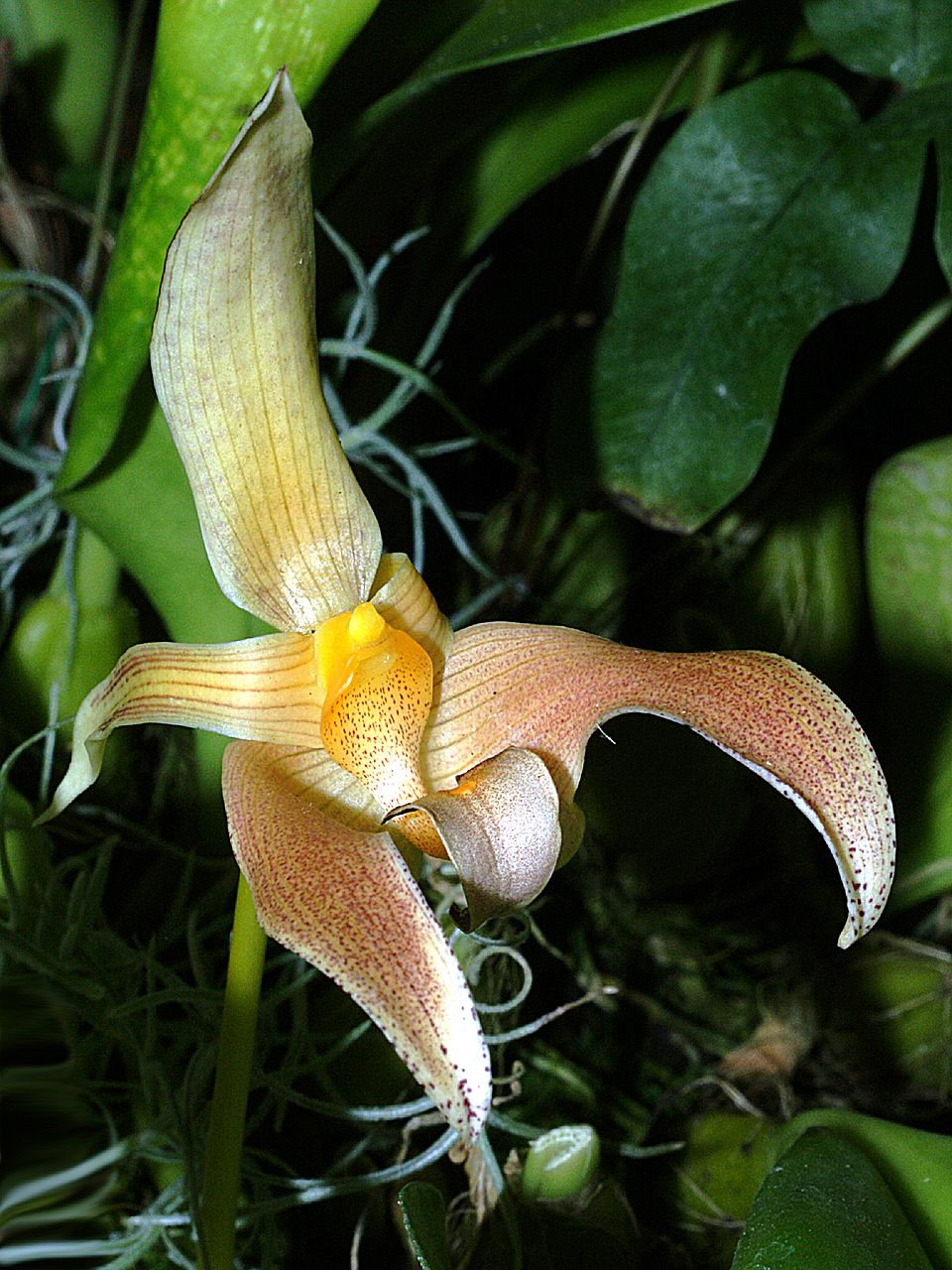

Conservation status
- CITES Appendix II (CITES)

Scientific classification
- Kingdom: Plantae
- Clade: Tracheophytes
- Clade: Angiosperms
- Clade: Monocots
- Order: Asparagales
- Family: Orchidaceae
- Subfamily: Epidendroideae
- Genus: Bulbophyllum
- Species: B. lobbii

Binomial name
- Bulbophyllum lobbii Lindl. (1847)

Synonyms
- Sarcopodium lobbii (Lindl.) Lindl. & Paxton (1851); Sestochilos uniflorum Breda (1827); Sarcobodium lobbii (Lindl.) Beer (1854); Bulbophyllum bataanense Ames (1905); Bulbophyllum siamense Rchb.f. (1867); Bulbophyllum lobbii var. siamense W. Saunders (1872); Phyllorkis lobbii (Lindl.) Kuntze (1891; Bulbophyllum lobbii var. breviflorum J.J.Sm. (1908); Bulbophyllum polystictum Ridl. (1909); Bulbophyllum sumatranum Garay (1996)

= Bulbophyllum lobbii =

Lobb's bulbophyllum

Species of orchid

Bulbophyllum lobbii (Lobb's bulbophyllum) is a species of orchid, also known as Thailand bulbophyllum or Sumatran bulbophyllum. It was named for the plant hunter Thomas Lobb, who introduced it to England from Java in 1846.

== Subspecies ==
Image	Name	Distribution
	Bulbophyllum lobbii subsp. boreoborneense Mangal, F.Velazquez & J.J.Verm.	Borneo (Sabah)
	Bulbophyllum lobbii subsp. breviflorum (J.J.Sm.) Mangal, F.Velazquez & J.J.Verm.	Borneo, Malaya, Sumatera, Thailand
	Bulbophyllum lobbii subsp. lobbii	Borneo, Jawa, Lesser Sunda Is., Malaya, Myanmar, Sumatera, Thailand
	Bulbophyllum lobbii subsp. siamense (Rchb.f.) Mangal, F.Velazquez & J.J.Verm.	Arunachal Pradesh to Indo-China, Borneo (Sabah), Philippines (Luzon)
