= Bulbophyllum pinelianum =

Rat-tail orchid

Scientific classification
- Kingdom: Plantae
- Clade: Tracheophytes
- Clade: Angiosperms
- Clade: Monocots
- Order: Asparagales
- Family: Orchidaceae
- Subfamily: Epidendroideae
- Genus: Bulbophyllum
- Species: B. pinelianum

Binomial name
- Bulbophyllum pinelianum (A.Rich.) Paul Abel Ormerod 2016

Synonyms
- Pachyrhachis pineliana A.Rich.; Pleurothallis pachyrachis A.Rich. in R.de la Sagra; Bolbophyllaria pachyrachis (A.Rich.) Rchb.f. in W.G.Walpers; Bulbophyllum pachyrachis (A.Rich.) Griseb.; Phyllorkis pachyrachis (A.Rich.) Kuntze

Species of orchid

Bulbophyllum pinelianum, the rat-tail orchid, is a species of orchid in the genus Bulbophyllum. It is widespread across southern Mexico, the West Indies, Central America and northern South America. It is also reported from Florida but apparently now extirpated from that state.
