= Bulbophyllum cirrhosum =

Scientific classification
- Kingdom: Plantae
- Clade: Embryophytes
- Clade: Tracheophytes
- Clade: Spermatophytes
- Clade: Angiosperms
- Clade: Monocots
- Order: Asparagales
- Family: Orchidaceae
- Subfamily: Epidendroideae
- Genus: Bulbophyllum
- Species: B. cirrhosum

Binomial name
- Bulbophyllum cirrhosum L.O.Williams 1940

Species of orchid

Bulbophyllum cirrhosum is a species of orchid in the genus Bulbophyllum from Mexico.
