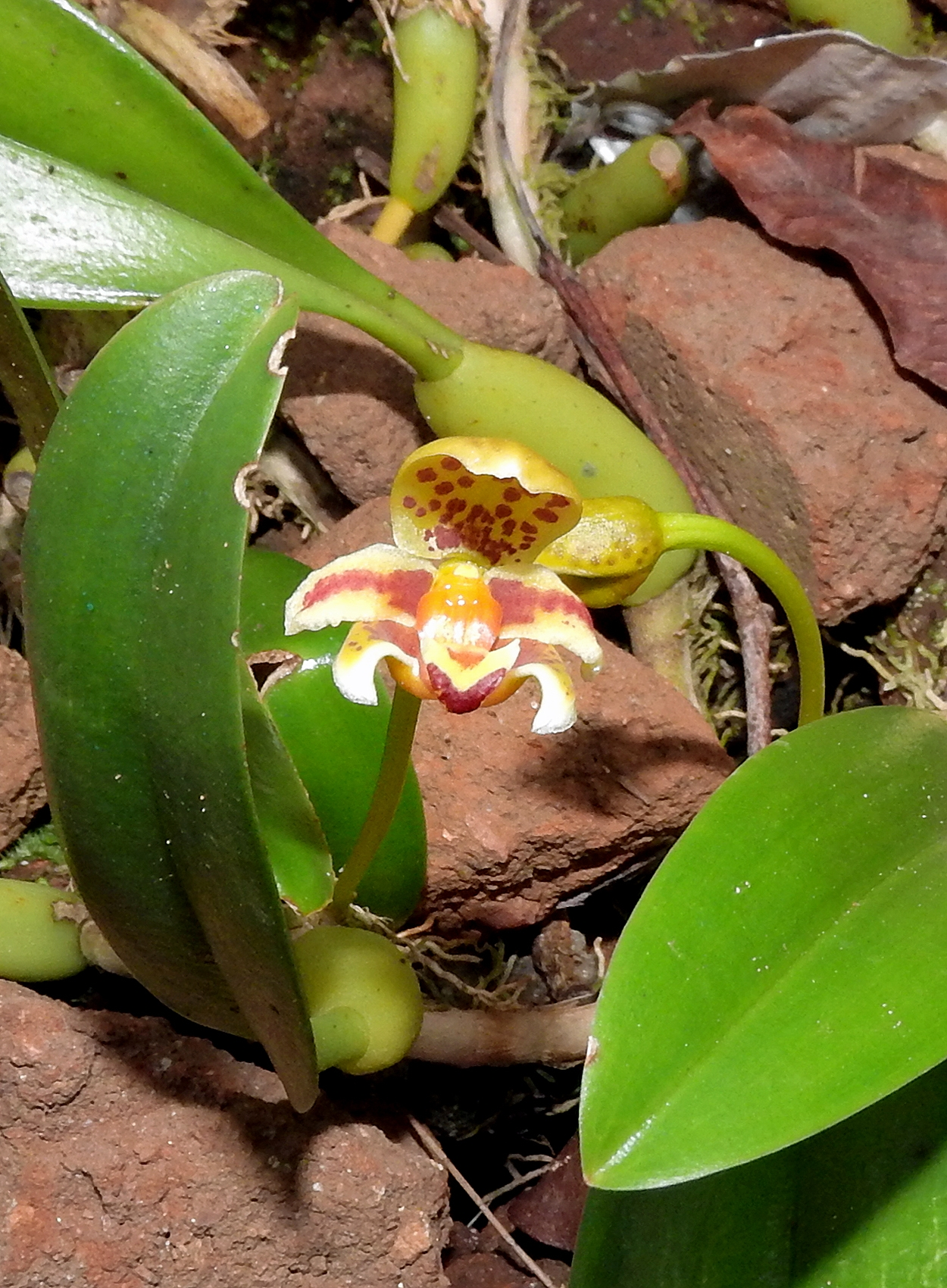

Scientific classification
- Kingdom: Plantae
- Clade: Tracheophytes
- Clade: Angiosperms
- Clade: Monocots
- Order: Asparagales
- Family: Orchidaceae
- Subfamily: Epidendroideae
- Genus: Bulbophyllum
- Species: B. pteroglossum

Binomial name
- Bulbophyllum pteroglossum Schltr.

= Bulbophyllum pteroglossum =

Species of orchid

Bulbophyllum pteroglossum is a species of orchid in the genus Bulbophyllum.
