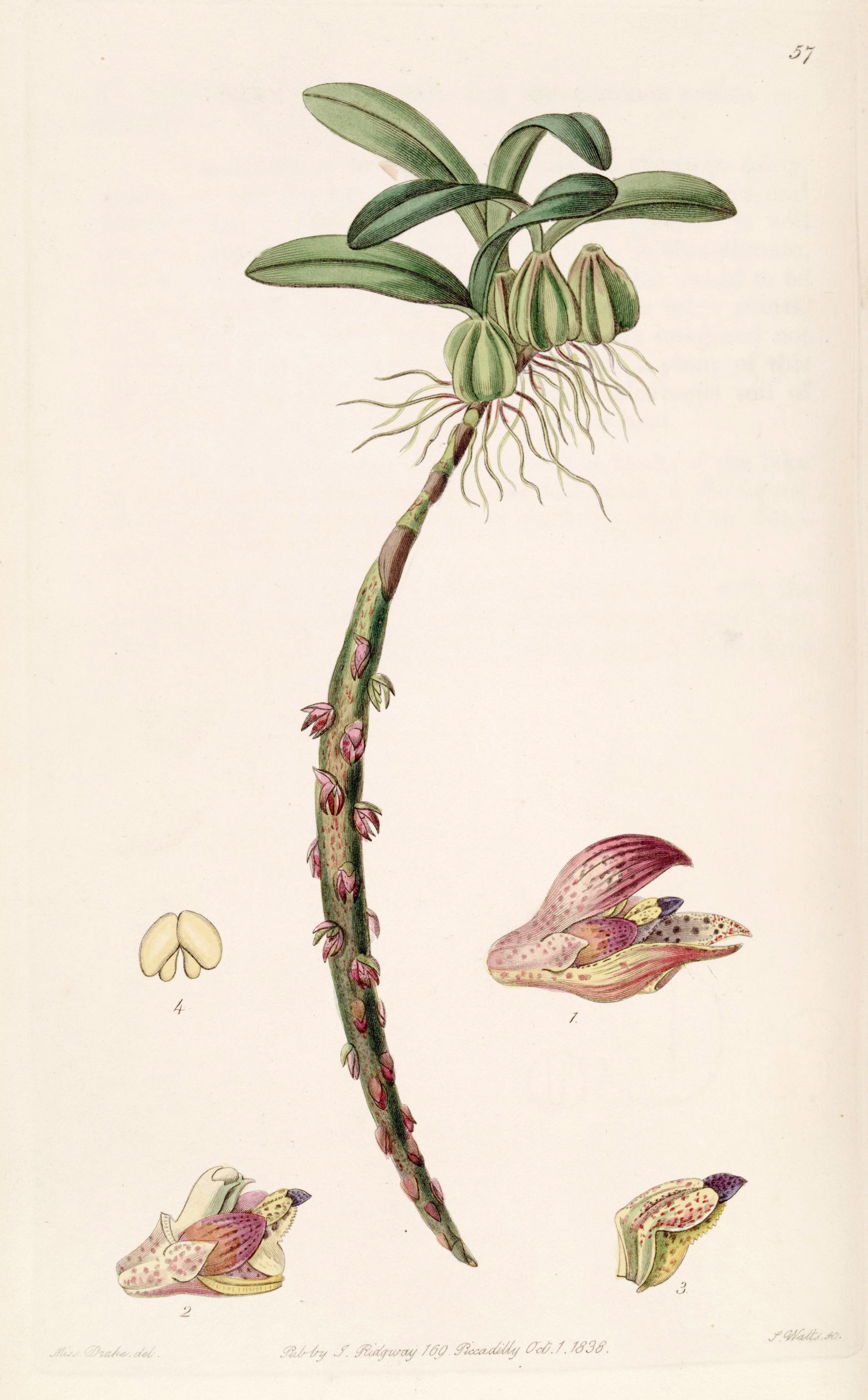

Scientific classification
- Kingdom: Plantae
- Clade: Tracheophytes
- Clade: Angiosperms
- Clade: Monocots
- Order: Asparagales
- Family: Orchidaceae
- Subfamily: Epidendroideae
- Genus: Bulbophyllum
- Species: B. bracteolatum

Binomial name
- Bulbophyllum bracteolatum Lindl. (1838)

Synonyms
- Bolbophyllaria bracteolata (Lindl.) Rchb.f. (1852); Bolbophyllaria sordida Rchb.f. (1861); Pleurothallis pachyrhyncha A.Rich. ex Benth.(1881); Phyllorkis bracteolata (Lindl.) Kuntze (1891)

= Bulbophyllum bracteolatum =

Species of orchid

Bulbophyllum bracteolatum is a species of orchid found in French Guiana, Suriname, Venezuela, Bolivia and Brazil.
