= Bulbophyllum micropetalum =

Conservation status
- Endangered (IUCN 3.1)

Scientific classification
- Kingdom: Plantae
- Clade: Tracheophytes
- Clade: Angiosperms
- Clade: Monocots
- Order: Asparagales
- Family: Orchidaceae
- Subfamily: Epidendroideae
- Genus: Bulbophyllum
- Species: B. micropetalum

Binomial name
- Bulbophyllum micropetalum Lindl.

Synonyms
- Genyorchis micropetalum (Lindl.) Schltr.; Phyllorkis micropetala (Lindl.) Kuntze; Polystachya micropetala (Lindl.) Rolfe in D.Oliver & auct. suc.

Species of orchid

Bulbophyllum micropetalum is a species of plant in the family Orchidaceae. It is found in Cameroon and the island of Bioko in Equatorial Guinea. Its natural habitat is subtropical or tropical moist montane forests. It is threatened by habitat loss.
