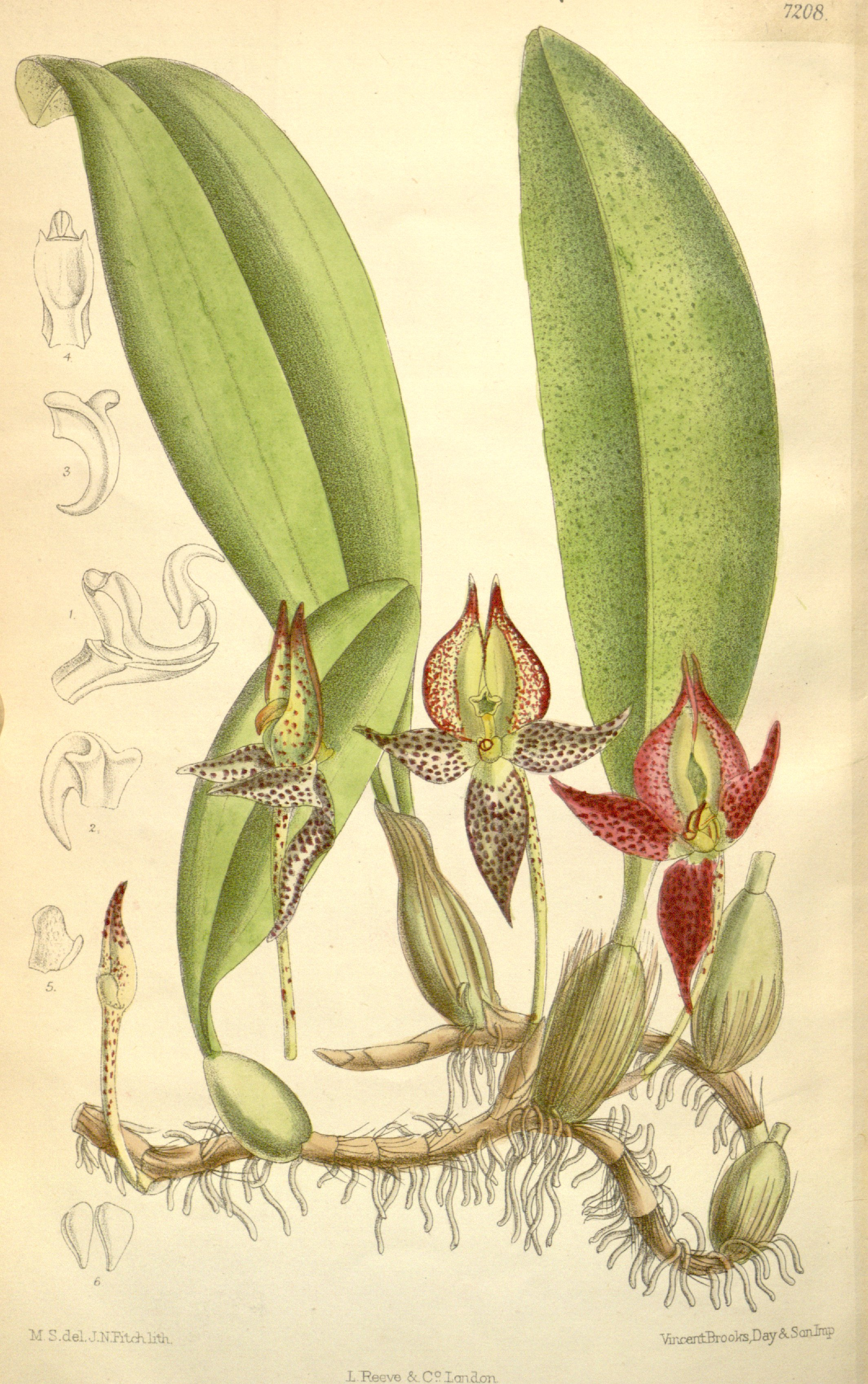

Scientific classification
- Kingdom: Plantae
- Clade: Tracheophytes
- Clade: Angiosperms
- Clade: Monocots
- Order: Asparagales
- Family: Orchidaceae
- Subfamily: Epidendroideae
- Genus: Bulbophyllum
- Species: B. macranthum

Binomial name
- Bulbophyllum macranthum Lindl. (1844)

Synonyms
- Sarcopodium macranthum (Lindl.) Lindl. & Paxton (1851); Sarcopodium purpureum Rchb.f. (1856); Bulbophyllum purpureum Náves (1880); Phyllorkis macrantha (Lindl.) Kuntze (1891); Bulbophyllum cochinchinense Gagnep. (1950); Carparomorchis macrantha (Lindl.) M.A. Clem. & D.L. Jones (2002)

= Bulbophyllum macranthum =

Large-flowered bulbophyllum

Species of orchid

Bulbophyllum macranthum (large-flowered bulbophyllum) is a species of orchid.
