= Fritz Hamer =

German botanist (1912–2004)

- Born: November 22, 1912; Hamburg
- Died: January 13, 2004 (91 years old); Sarasota, Florida
- Scientific career
- Fields: Botanist, teacher
- Author abbrev. (botany): Hamer

Fritz Hamer (22 November 1912, Hamburg - 13 January 2004, Sarasota, Florida) was an outstanding German botanist who worked in Central America, specializing in orchids.

== Biography ==
Hamer received a business education and was employed by a Dutch export company. In 1937 the company sent him to Venezuela; and in 1938 to Guatemala, where he joined World War II. In 1942 he returned to Germany and served in the army during the Russian campaign. In 1948, at the end of the war, he returned to Guatemala and established himself in El Salvador, where he created a company to import and distribute machinery and equipment.

His interest in families of orchids began in 1960 when he saw a specimen of Miltonia, of which he made a beautiful illustration. He then took to the road and began to take photographs, make illustrations, and write descriptions. But he noticed the lack of literature on orchids. In 1925 there were 63 species in 28 genera, described by Standley and S. Calderón, and nothing more. So Hamer, who had already published a number of articles about orchids in his country, prepared The Orchids of El Salvador, which was published in two volumes in 1974 by the Ministry of Education of El Salvador; 279 descriptions and illustrations spp. in 67 genera. Hamer, with no scientific training in natural sciences, received invaluable help from Leslie A. Garay, his mentor and friend. At the beginning the Salvadoran Civil War, Hamer left El Salvador and moved to Florida, where he worked as a scientist at the Marie Selby Botanical Gardens. In 1981 he published the third volume of The Orchids of El Salvador, with 362 spp. 93 Gros. Salvadoran orchids.

The Missouri Botanical Garden planned to publish the Flora of Nicaragua, with the University of Managua. Hamer asked to be responsible for the study of the family Orchidaceae. Hamer visited the herbaria of Kew and the Field Museum of Chicago by Pan-American Agricultural School of Honduras, Managua, the University of Michigan. In 1982 he published the 7th installment of the 1st series of Icones Plantarum Tropicarum, edited by Dodson, with the first 100 descriptions and illustrations of the orchids of Nicaragua. Hamer published 500 additional plates for Icones. Between 1988 and 1990 they were published in Selbyana Hamer (Vols. 10 and 11) the Orchids of Central America - an Illustrated Field Guide, with all its illustrations of the spp. region, but no descriptions. Then the Flora of Nicaragua was published by the Missouri Botanical Garden in 2001, and Hamer, 89 years old, was the author of Chapter Orchidaceae, describing 587 species in 144 genera.

He was married to Hedwig Pfister for 42 years, to whom he dedicated one of the species he discovered: Maxillaria hedwigae (Hamer & Dodson). He had three children, one of whom died in El Salvador in 2003. That tragedy clouded the last months of his life, and he died in Sarasota, Florida, on 13 January 2004.

== Honours ==
=== Eponymy ===
- Beloglottis hameri (Garay)
- Pelexia hameri (Garay)
- Ponthieva hameri (Dressler)

== See also ==
- List of orchidologists
