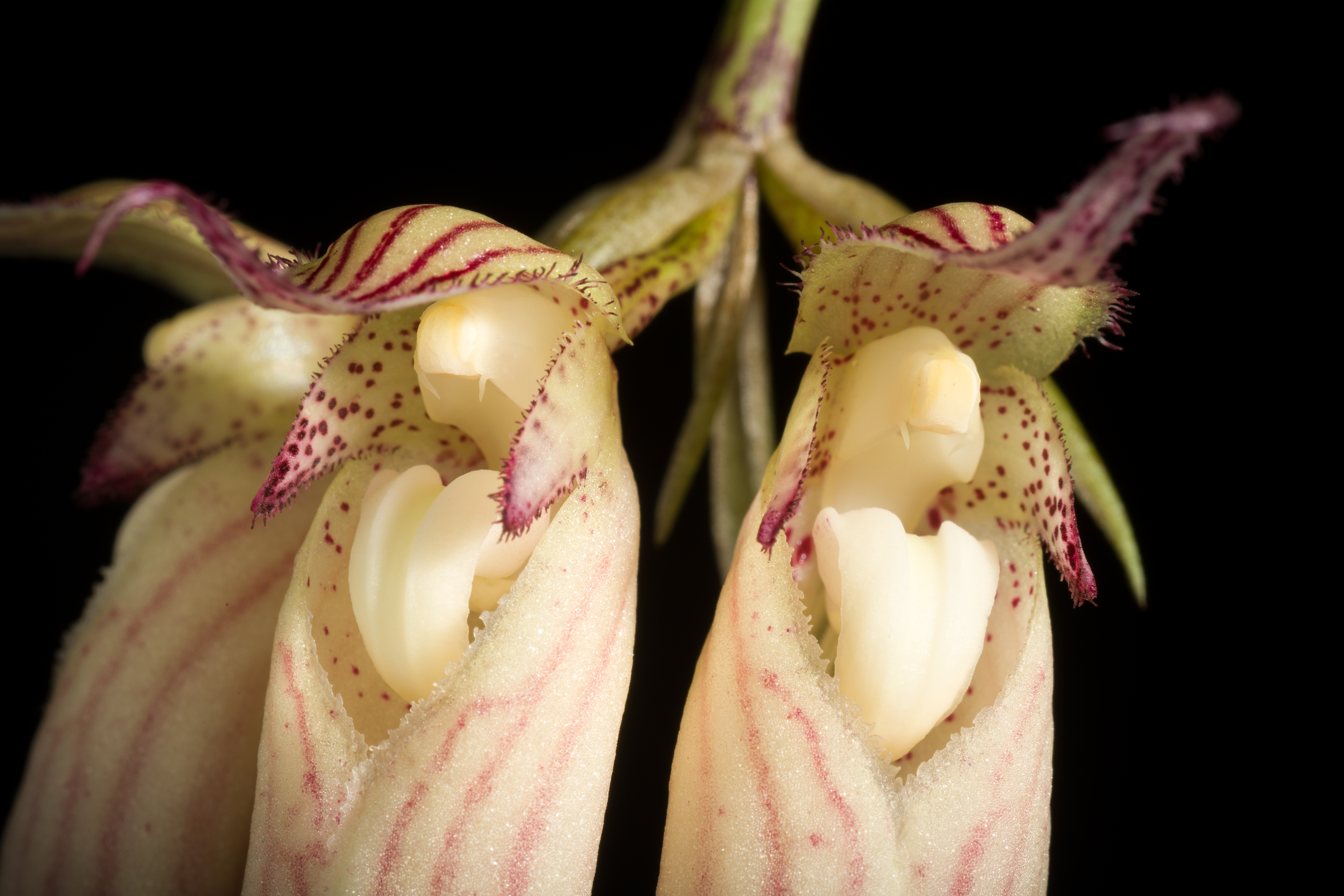
- Bulbophyllum longissimum 'Fujio'

Scientific classification
- Kingdom: Plantae
- Clade: Tracheophytes
- Clade: Angiosperms
- Clade: Monocots
- Order: Asparagales
- Family: Orchidaceae
- Subfamily: Epidendroideae
- Genus: Bulbophyllum
- Section: Bulbophyllum sect. Cirrhopetaloides; Garay, Hamer & Siegerist 1994

Type species
- Bulbophyllum longissimum

Species
- See text

Synonyms
- Mastigion Garay, Hamer & Siegerist 1994

= Bulbophyllum sect. Cirrhopetaloides =

Section of flowering plants

Bulbophyllum sect. Cirrhopetaloides is a section of the genus Bulbophyllum.

== Description ==
The pseudobulbs are conical-shaped, unifloliate and obscurely angled with a single spoon-like leaf atop each pseudobulb. Plant blooms on inflorescence with an umbel of flowers.

== Distribution ==
Plants from this section are found from India, Sri Lanka, and China to Southeast Asia.

== Species ==
Bulbophyllum section Cirrhopetaloides comprises the following species:

Image	Name	Distribution	Elevation (m)
	Bulbophyllum albociliatum (Tang S.Liu & H.Y.Su) K.Nakaj 1973	Taiwan	1,300–1,800 metres (4,300–5,900 ft)
	Bulbophyllum appendiculatum (Rolfe) J.J.Sm. 1912	India and Sikkim	
	Bulbophyllum bicolor Lindl.1830	Hong Kong, Vietnam	100–500 metres (330–1,640 ft)
	Bulbophyllum boninense (Schltr.) J.J. Sm. 1912	Japan (Bonin Islands)	
	Bulbophyllum collettii King & Pantl. 1897	Assam to N. Myanmar.	
	Bulbophyllum elliae Rchb.f. 1861	Sri Lanka	
	Bulbophyllum fascinator [Rolfe]Rolfe 1908	Malaysia, Sumatra, Borneo and the Philippines	0–1,000 metres (0–3,281 ft)
	Bulbophyllum frostii Summerh. 1928	Vietnam	1,450–1,500 metres (4,760–4,920 ft)
	Bulbophyllum inconspicuum Maxim. 1887	Japan, the Ryukyus and Korea	
	Bulbophyllum karbianglongensis K.Gogoi & R.Hondiqui 2021	Assam	400–500 metres (1,300–1,600 ft)
	Bulbophyllum keralense M.Kumar & Sequiera 2001	India (Kerala)	1,800–2,000 metres (5,900–6,600 ft)
	Bulbophyllum kuanwuense S.W.Chung & T.C.Hsu 2006	Taiwan	1,800–2,150 metres (5,910–7,050 ft)
	Bulbophyllum longissimum (Ridl.) J.J. Sm. 1912	Thailand, Myanmar, Borneo and Malaysia	
	Bulbophyllum melanoglossum Hayata 1914	Taiwan	400–1,800 metres (1,300–5,900 ft)
	Bulbophyllum mona-lisae Sieder & Kiehn 2009	Philippines (Mindanao)	1,460 metres (4,790 ft)
	Bulbophyllum ornatissimum (Rchb. f.) J.J. Sm. 1912	Sikkim	
	Bulbophyllum pingtungense S.S. Ying & C. Chen 1985	Taiwan	100–400 metres (330–1,310 ft)
	Bulbophyllum proboscideum (Gagnep.) Seidenf. & Smitinand 1961	Thailand and Laos	
	Bulbophyllum putidum [Teijsm. & Binn.]J.J.Sm. 1912	peninsular Malaysia, Sumatra, Borneo and the Philippines	200–1,400 metres (660–4,590 ft)
	Bulbophyllum roxburghii (Lindl.) Rchb. f. 1864	Assam India, Sikkim and the eastern Himalayas	300 metres (980 ft)
	Bulbophyllum setaceum T.P. Lin 1975	Taiwan	1,500–2,400 metres (4,900–7,900 ft)
	Bulbophyllum sridithii Vuong, Aver., H. Tran & V.S. Dang 2020	Vietnam	
	Bulbophyllum surigaense Ames & Quisumb. 1933 publ. 1934	Philippines (Mindanao Island)	
	Bulbophyllum taiwanense (Fukuy.) K.Nakaj. 1973	Taiwan	0–1,000 metres (0–3,281 ft)
	Bulbophyllum thwaitesii Rchb.f. 1874	Sri Lanka	900–2,200 metres (3,000–7,200 ft)
	Bulbophyllum trimenii (Hook.f.) J.J.Sm. 1912	Sri Lanka	750 metres (2,460 ft)
	Bulbophyllum wendlandianum [Kraenzl]Dammer 1912	China (Yunnan), Myanmar and Thailand	200–2,000 metres (660–6,560 ft)
	Bulbophyllum wightii Rchb.f. 1861	Sri Lanka	700–1,850 metres (2,300–6,070 ft)
	Bulbophyllum yunxiaoense M.H.Li, J.F.Liu & S.P.Chen 2017	China (Fujian)	200 metres (660 ft)
