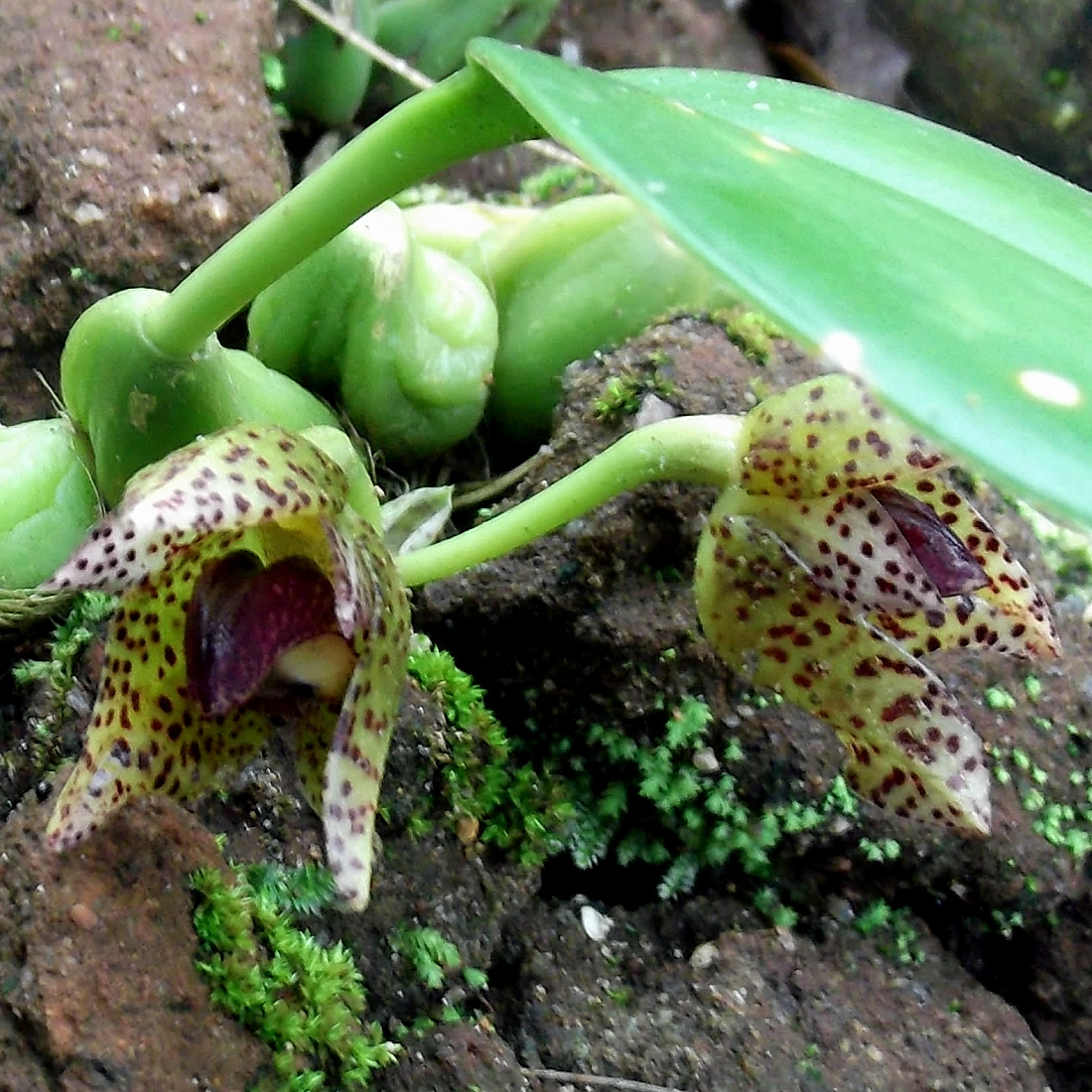
- Bulbophyllum leopardinum

Scientific classification
- Kingdom: Plantae
- Clade: Tracheophytes
- Clade: Angiosperms
- Clade: Monocots
- Order: Asparagales
- Family: Orchidaceae
- Subfamily: Epidendroideae
- Genus: Bulbophyllum
- Section: Bulbophyllum sect. Leopardinae; Bentham 1883

Type species
- Bulbophyllum leopardinum

Species
- See text

Synonyms
- Bulbophyllum sect. Leopardina Bentham & J. D. Hooker, 1883

= Bulbophyllum sect. Leopardinae =

Section of flowering plants

Bulbophyllum sect. Leopardinae is a section of the genus Bulbophyllum.

== Description ==
Species in this section have nodes at base of pedicel coinciding with bract attachment, or removed.

== Distribution ==
Plants from this section are found from the Himalayas to West Pacific.

== Species ==
Bulbophyllum section Leopardinae comprises the following species:

Image	Name	Distribution	Elevation (m)
	Bulbophyllum ambrosia [Hance] Schlechter 1919	China (Fujian, Guangdong, Guangxi, Hainan and Yunnan ) and Vietnam	300–1,300 metres (980–4,270 ft)
	Bulbophyllum griffithii (Lindl.) Rchb. f. 1864	Assam India, Bhutan, Sikkim and southern China	1,000–3,000 metres (3,300–9,800 ft)
	Bulbophyllum leopardinum (Wall.) Lindl. 1830	Assam India, Nepal, Bhutan, Sikkim, Myanmar, China (Yunnan), and Thailand	1,300–3,300 metres (4,300–10,800 ft)
	Bulbophyllum obrienianum Rolfe 1892	Assam India and Bhutan	1,200–1,640 metres (3,940–5,380 ft)
	Bulbophyllum pectinatum Finet 1897	sounthern China, Myanmar, Thailand, Vietnam, Cambodia, Laos, India and Taiwan	1,000–2,500 metres (3,300–8,200 ft)
	Bulbophyllum psittacoglossum Rchb. f. 1863	China (Yunnan), Thailand, Myanmar, Laos and Vietnam	1,200–1,700 metres (3,900–5,600 ft)
	Bulbophyllum transarisanensis Hayata 1916	Taiwan	1,500–2,500 metres (4,900–8,200 ft)
	Bulbophyllum yunnanense Rolfe 1903	Nepal, China	1,400–3,200 metres (4,600–10,500 ft)
