= Mark Isaac-Williams =

Hong Kong botanical artist (born 1939)

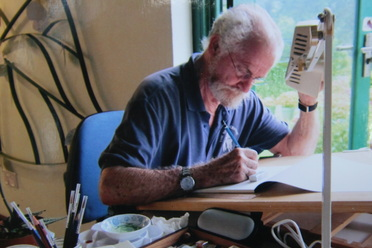
- Mark Isaac-Williams
- Born: 16 November 1939 (age 86); Hong Kong
- Education: Shrewsbury College, England
- Occupations: Botanical artist Orchid expert
- Website: Mark Botanical Art

Mark Isaac-Williams (born 16 November 1939) is an English botanical artist, horticulturalist, and orchid expert; he has published several books on the subject.

== Early life and education ==
Williams was born in Hong Kong to British parents, father Leonard, a sea captain, and mother Margery Isaac. In June 1940 the British Government required all women and children to leave Hong Kong as the Japanese forces had surrounded Hong Kong. Williams and his mother sailed to Australia and lived in Watsons Bay, Sydney. His father remained in Hong Kong and was interned at the Stanley Internment Camp. After WWII, Williams and his mother spent time in Shropshire, England, before returning to Hong Kong, where he and his parents lived at The Peninsula. The hotel had been occupied by the Japanese army during the war and at that point was in a very poor state, Williams describing it as "full of mosquitos and rats."

He attended Kowloon Junior School and King George V secondary school. In 1951 the family moved into a new home on Kimberley Street. He then attended Moor Park School in Shropshire, England as a boarder from the age of 11, where he kept a "nature notebook". He moved to St Margaret's College in Devon to finish his O-Levels and then on to Shrewsbury College.

== Work ==
After school, Williams initially worked for an advertising company in London but moved back to Hong Kong in 1959. He worked as a clerk for the British government communications office, stationed at Victoria Barracks, for seven years. In 1962 he started teaching swimming at Diocesan Girls' School. The job evolved to become a full-time PE teaching position, which he held for 12 years. Around this time, he joined an "amateur orchid group" led by Gloria Barretto, an orchid expert at Kadoorie Farm and Botanic Garden (KFBG).

In 1979 Williams joined KFBG as a horticulturist, working alongside Barretto. On behalf of KFBG he travelled widely, including Australia, Taiwan, Thailand, Malaysia, Nepal and Papua New Guinea, collecting orchid specimens and studying plants in their native environment. In 1984 he left KFBG and ran two florist businesses. In 1985 he moved to Australia to run a plant nursery in Queensland. He lived in the UK from 2000 to 2006, returning to Hong Kong afterwards.

In Hong Kong, Williams was re-hired by KFBG to revive the Orchid Haven which had grown from six species in 1977 to over 150 in 2006. In 2011 the Gloria Barretto Orchid Sanctuary was opened, where Williams worked as a consultant. In 2013 he gave up this role and became KFBG's first ever resident artist. By the time he retired in 2020 he had painted pictures 130 varieties of orchids.

== Artwork ==
As an artist, Williams is entirely self-taught. His favourite medium is watercolour. In 2013 he earned a diploma from the Society of Botanical Artists (SBA). His prints are sold through the Lion Rock Press.

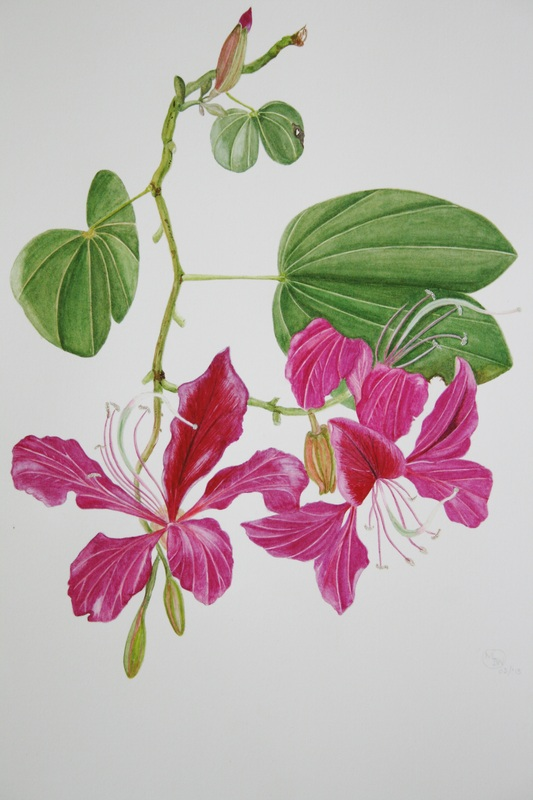
Bauhinia blakeana, watercolour painting by Mark Isaac-Williams

=== Exhibitions ===
Williams' paintings have appeared in the following exhibitions:

- St John's Cathedral, Hong Kong, 2007
- United Services Recreation Club, 2009
- Out of the Woods: Celebrating Trees in Public Gardens American Society of Botanical Artists. Touring exhibition from 2017 to 2018. Venues included Huntington Library, Tucson Botanical Gardens and Minnesota Landscape Arboretum
- Green Fingers, Artist's Hands 2021, Kadoorie Farm and Botanic Garden

=== Awards ===
- 2011 – American Society of Botanical Artists Nepenthes macfarlanei – Award of Merit
- 2015 – 17th Annual Botanical Art Exhibition Pitcher Plant collection – Bourn Award for Distinction with an Emphasis on Horticultural Presentation - for Nepenthes macfarlanei

Williams also won the following awards at the Royal Horticultural Society Botanical Art and Photography Exhibition:

- 2016 – The Invasive Chinese Banyan Tree (Ficus macrocarpa) - silver-gilt medal
- 2017 – A variety of Asian bamboos - silver-gilt medal
- 2018 – The flower, the pollinator, and the fruit - bronze medal
- 2021 – Orchid species of Asia - silver medal

== Publications ==
Williams has published the following books:

- History of the Hong Kong Post Office (commissioned by the HKPO)
- Introduction to the Orchids of Asia (1988) Pub. HarperCollins ISBN 9780207159558
- Introduction to the Orchids of Australia CD-ROM (1998) Pub. Natural Learning Proprietary
- Growing Successful Orchids in the Greenhouse and Conservatory (2003) Pub. Guild of Master Craftsman Publications ISBN 9781861082718
- From Dragon to Dragon (2004) Pub. Book Guild Publishing Ltd ISBN 9781857768770
- The Wild Orchids of Hong Kong (2011) by Gloria Barretto Pub. Natural History ISBN 9789838121361 - contributor
- The Hong Kong I Knew: Scenes and Stories from a Childhood in Kowloon (2022) Pub. Blacksmith Books ISBN 978-9887963950

The following paintings have appeared in issues of Curtis's Botanical Magazine:

- Bulbophyllum bicolor (December 2010)
- Bulbophyllum ambrosia (2014)
- Dendrobium hesperis (August 2020)
- Pecteilis susannae (April 2021)

Also: Flora of China Illustrations: Orchidaceae Vol. 25, Pub. Science Press, Beijing

== Other ==
Williams makes wooden models of historical ships that have carried botanical artists through the ages, including a two-foot model of HMS Beagle.

== See also ==
- RTHK interview with Williams in 2022
