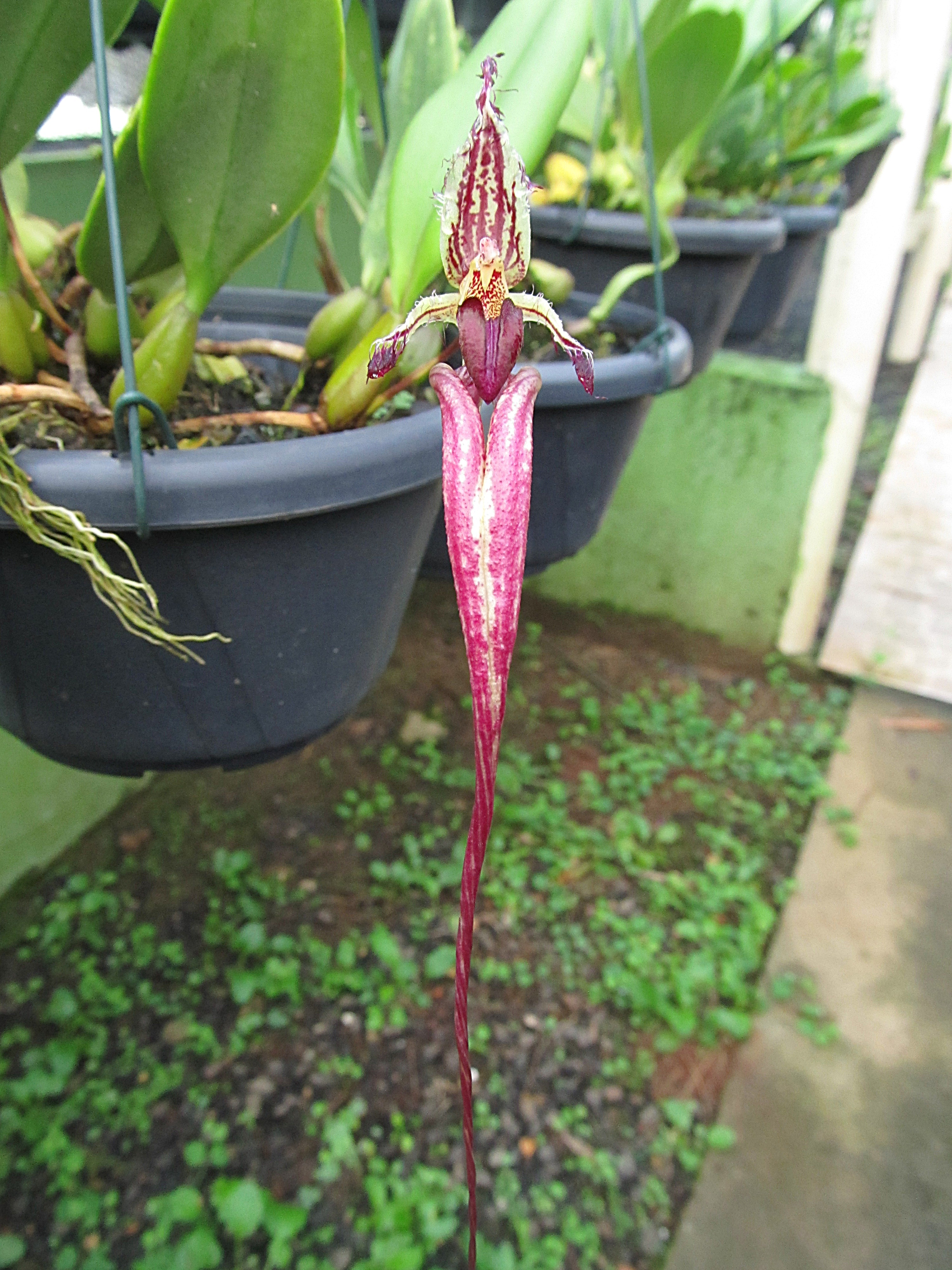
- Flower and leaves
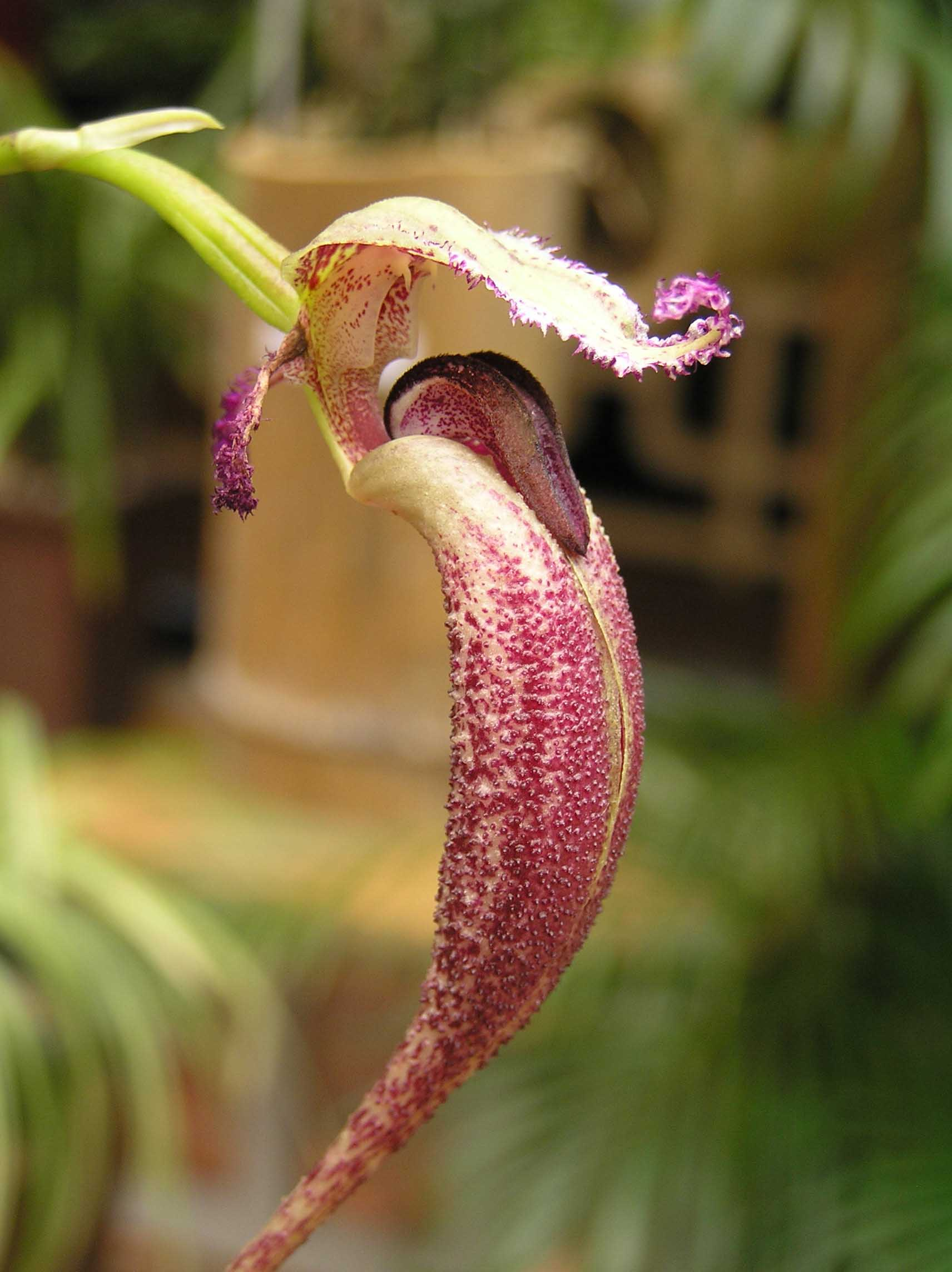
- Close-up of flower

Scientific classification
- Kingdom: Plantae
- Clade: Tracheophytes
- Clade: Angiosperms
- Clade: Monocots
- Order: Asparagales
- Family: Orchidaceae
- Subfamily: Epidendroideae
- Genus: Bulbophyllum
- Species: B. fascinator

Binomial name
- Bulbophyllum fascinator (Rolfe) Rolfe

Synonyms
- Cirrhopetalum fascinator Rolfe; Mastigion fascinator (Rolfe) Garay, Hamer & Siegerist

= Bulbophyllum fascinator =

Species of plant

Bulbophyllum fascinator is a species of flowering plant in the orchid family Orchidaceae, native to northeastern India, Southeast Asia, and northern Malesia. A pseudobulbous epiphyte found in lowlands, it can be confused with Bulbophyllum putidum. It is most noteworthy for its very long, magenta and white striped petals, which can be as much as 32 cm (13 in) in length.
