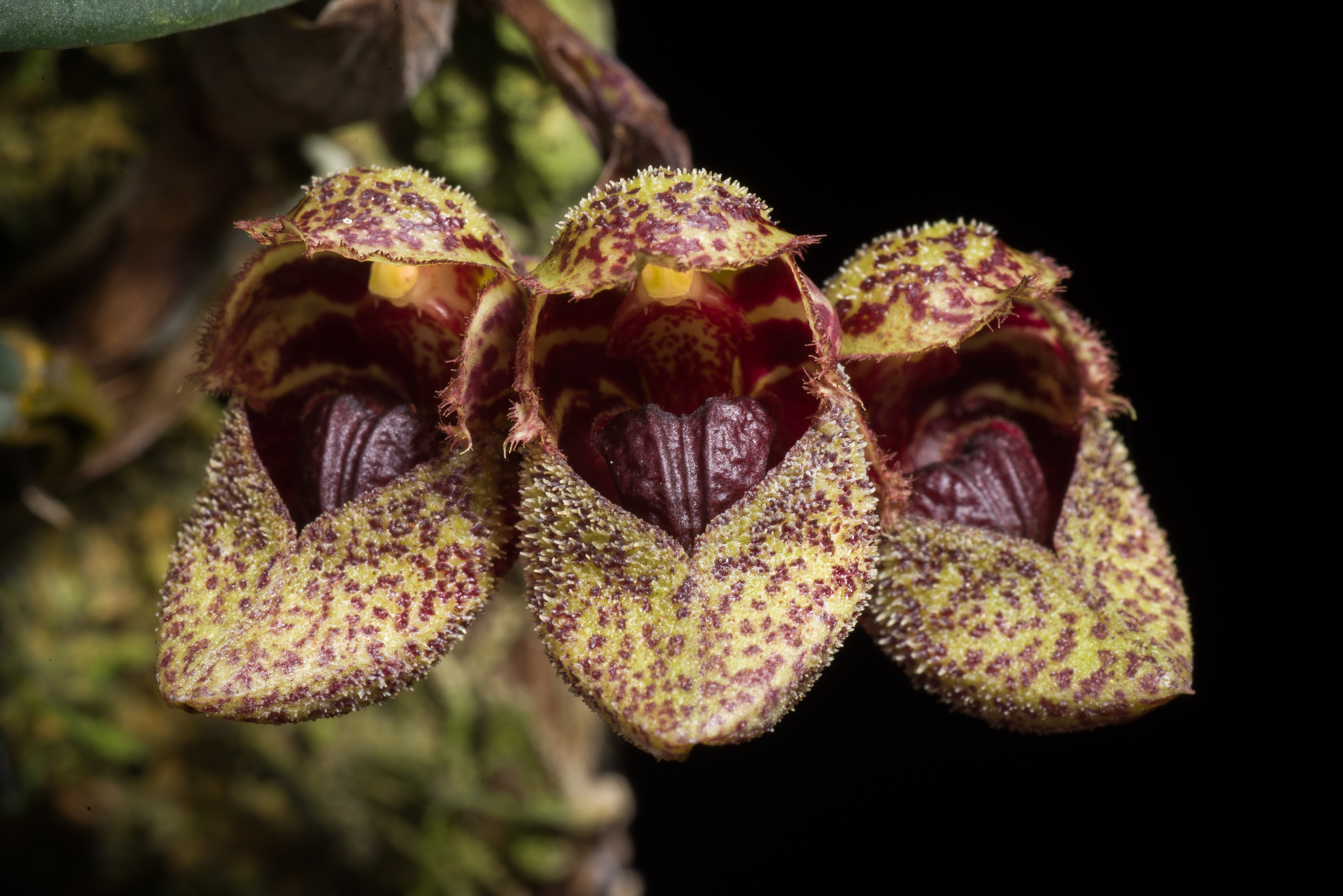

Scientific classification
- Kingdom: Plantae
- Clade: Tracheophytes
- Clade: Angiosperms
- Clade: Monocots
- Order: Asparagales
- Family: Orchidaceae
- Subfamily: Epidendroideae
- Genus: Bulbophyllum
- Species: B. frostii

Binomial name
- Bulbophyllum frostii Summerh. (1928)

Synonyms
- Cirrhopetalum bootanoides Guillaumin (1957); Bulbophyllum bootanoides (Guillaumin) Seidenf. (1973); Cirrhopetalum frostii (Summerh.) Garay, Hamer & Siegerist (1994)

= Bulbophyllum frostii =

Species of orchid

Bulbophyllum frostii, commonly known as Frost's bulbophyllum or Dutchman's shoes is a species of orchid, In the wild it grows as an epiphyte, inhabiting evergreen seasonal lowland rainforests in Vietnam and more rarely in Thailand, including the Malay peninsula. It was more recently reported growing in the Yunnan province of China during a series of botanical surveys between 2017 and 2020. This plant is usually found at elevations of around 1500m above sea level.

== Description ==
Bulbophyllum frostii has green to purple pseudobulbs spaced roughly 1/2 in (1.3 cm) apart on a creeping rhizome. Each pseudobulb features a single succulent, dark green, oblong-elliptic leaf. Although this species of Bulbophyllum is found in seasonal forests where the winters are noticeably cooler than the summer, it does not shed its leaves in the colder months, unlike some other members of the genus.

This species has a flower size of roughly 1 in (2.5 cm). These flowers possess characteristics such as an unpleasant scent and flowers that mimic carrion, which is a common trait in many other members of the genus bulbophyllum. Both of these characteristics attract flies, which are the main pollinators of this plant. Blooms emerge in small clusters from the base of the pseudobulbs, and can be quite variable from plant to plant, ranging from flowers with fused sepals, to sepals that are completely detached from one another.

== Cultivation ==
Depending on the climate, Bulbophyllum frostii and other epiphytic orchids can be grown in pots filled with fine bark or sphagnum moss, They are also often grown mounted, usually on a wood of some kind such as cork. It thrives in an environment with high humidity and good ventilation, and grows best with frequent but diluted fertilisations. It is a cool to warm growing orchid preferring temperatures of between 18 and 24 °C (64 and 75 °F) In the day and appreciates a night time drop in temperature.

== Taxonomy ==
Bulbophyllum frostii belongs to the large genus Bulbophyllum. Bulbophyllum frostii was first described by Victor Samuel Summerhayes in 1928.
