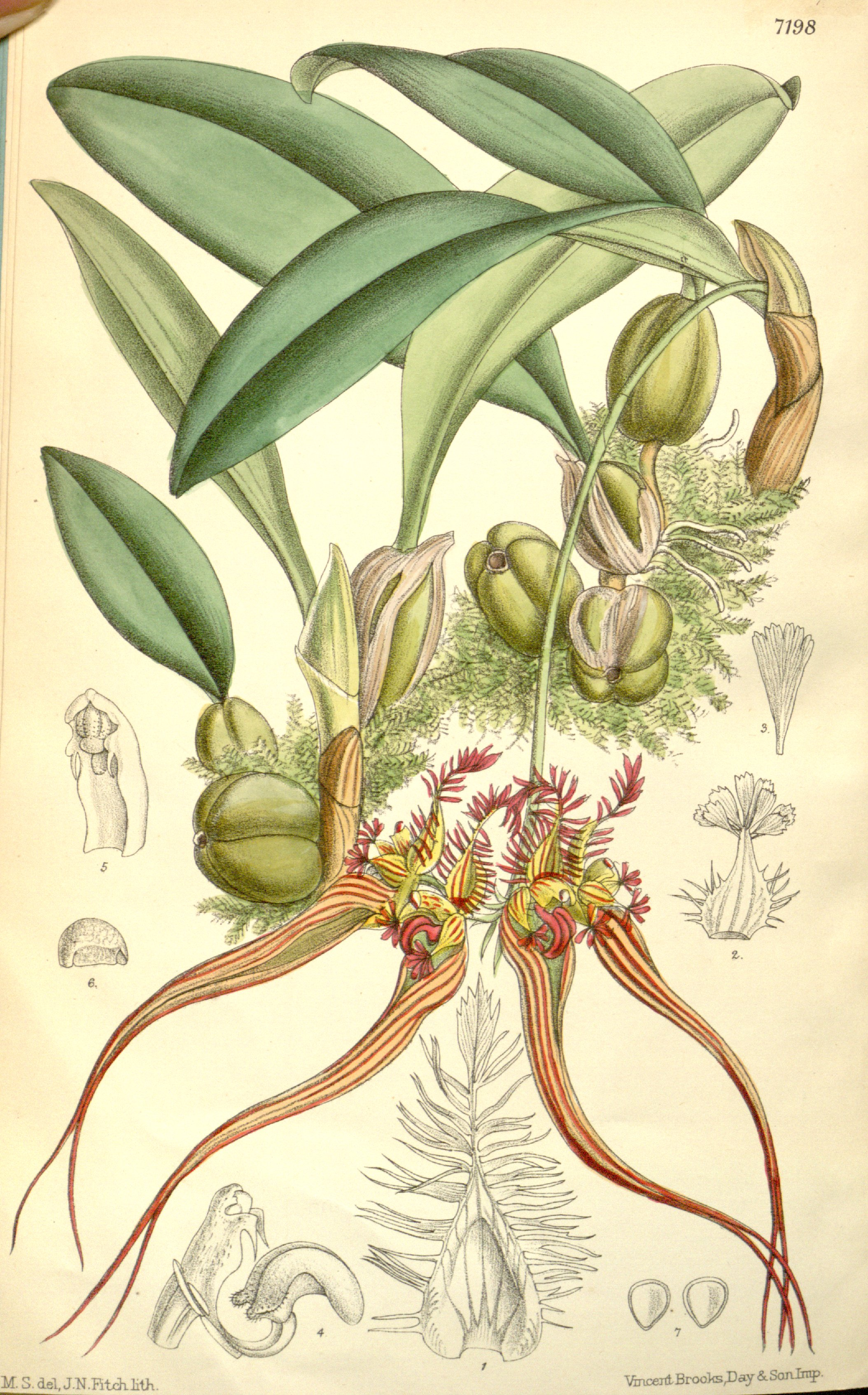

Conservation status
- CITES Appendix II (CITES)

Scientific classification
- Kingdom: Plantae
- Clade: Tracheophytes
- Clade: Angiosperms
- Clade: Monocots
- Order: Asparagales
- Family: Orchidaceae
- Subfamily: Epidendroideae
- Genus: Bulbophyllum
- Species: B. wendlandianum

Binomial name
- Bulbophyllum wendlandianum (Kraenzl.) Dammer

Synonyms
- Cirrhopetalum fastuosum Rchb.f. (1883); Cirrhopetalum collettii Hemsl. (1896); Cirrhopetalum wendlandianum Kraenzl. (1900); Cirrhopetalum proliferum hort. (1896); Bulbophyllum collettii Auct. non Kng. & Pntlg. (1961); Cirrhopetalum collettianum Hemsl. ex Collett & Hemsl. (1890);

= Bulbophyllum wendlandianum =

Species of orchid

Bulbophyllum wendlandianum is a species of orchid in the genus Bulbophyllum.

== Distribution ==
Bulbophyllum wendlandianum has a native range in Myanmar, Laos, and Thailand.
