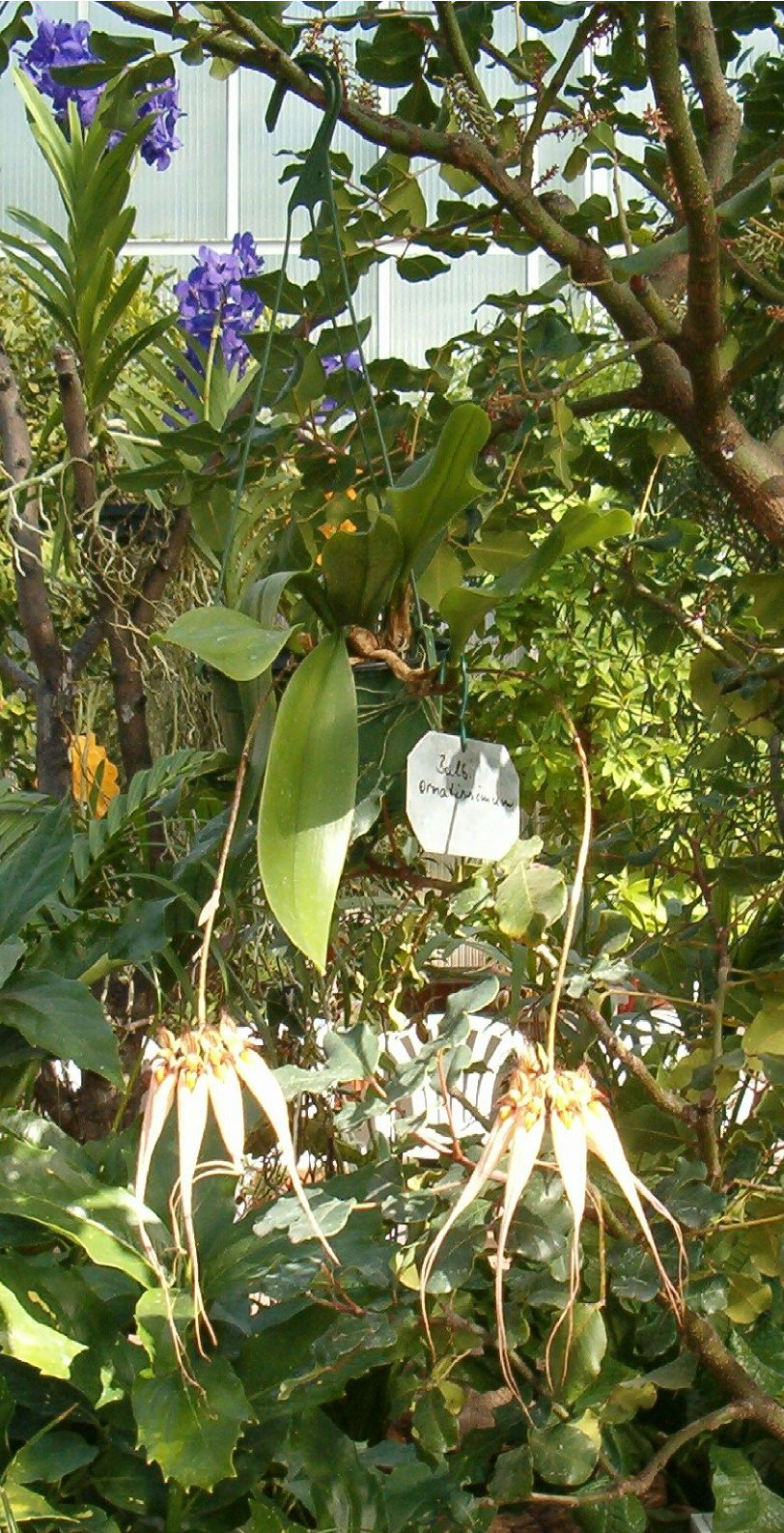

Scientific classification
- Kingdom: Plantae
- Clade: Tracheophytes
- Clade: Angiosperms
- Clade: Monocots
- Order: Asparagales
- Family: Orchidaceae
- Subfamily: Epidendroideae
- Genus: Bulbophyllum
- Species: B. ornatissimum

Binomial name
- Bulbophyllum ornatissimum (Rchb.f.) J.J.Sm. (1912)

Synonyms
- Cirrhopetalum ornatissimum Rchb.f. (1882) (Basionym); Phyllorkis ornatissima (Rchb.f.) Kuntze (1891); Mastigion ornatissimum (Rchb.f.) Garay, Hamer & Siegerist (1994)

= Bulbophyllum ornatissimum =

Species of orchid

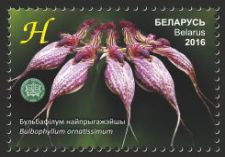
Stamp of Belarus

Bulbophyllum ornatissimum is a species of orchid.

Media related to Bulbophyllum ornatissimum at Wikimedia Commons
