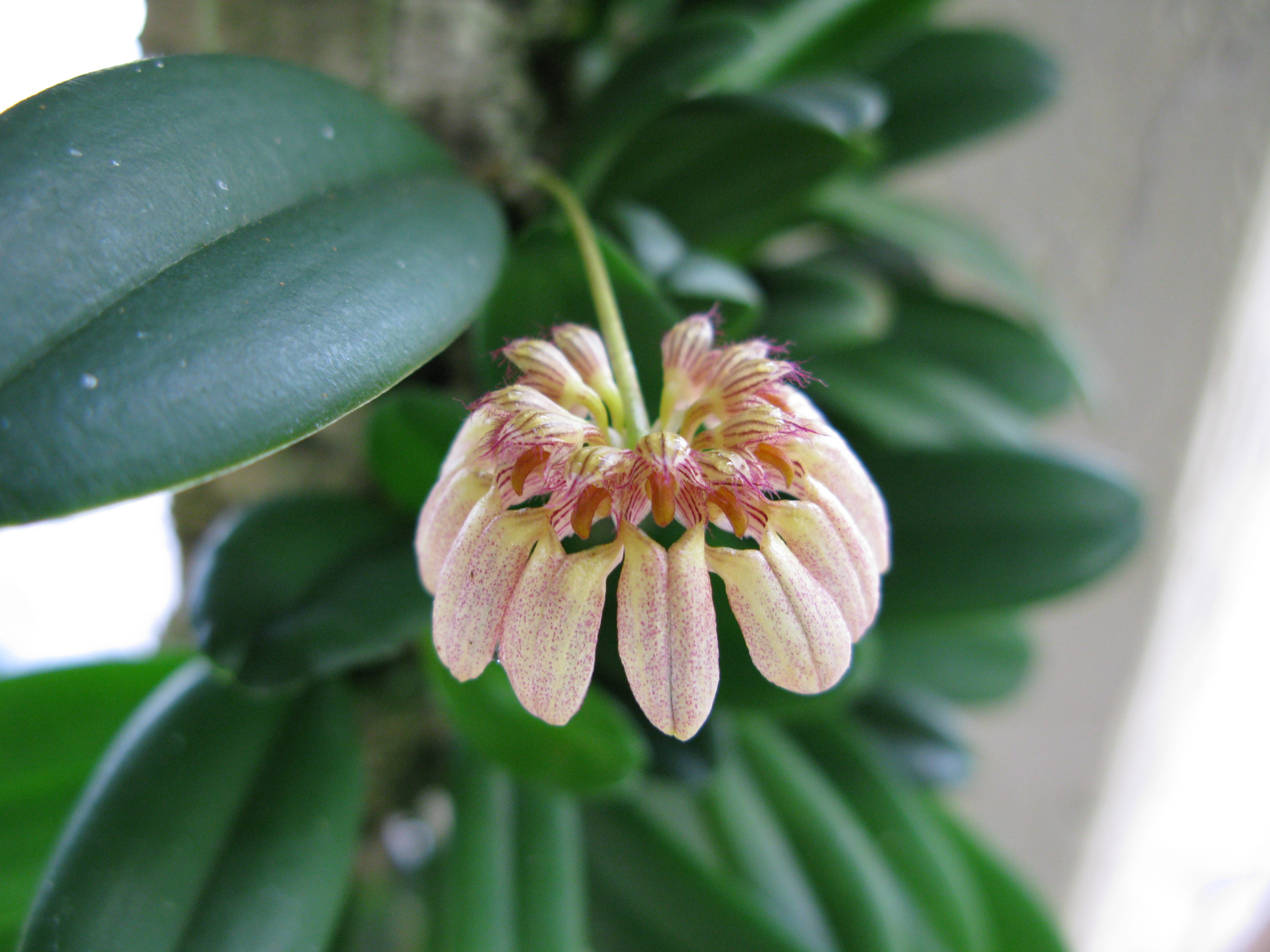

Scientific classification
- Kingdom: Plantae
- Clade: Tracheophytes
- Clade: Angiosperms
- Clade: Monocots
- Order: Asparagales
- Family: Orchidaceae
- Subfamily: Epidendroideae
- Genus: Bulbophyllum
- Species: B. roxburghii

Binomial name
- Bulbophyllum roxburghii (Lindl.) Rchb. f.

= Bulbophyllum roxburghii =

Species of orchid

Bulbophyllum roxburghii is a species of orchid in the genus Bulbophyllum.

The Latin specific epithet roxburghii refers to the Scottish Botanist William Roxburgh.
