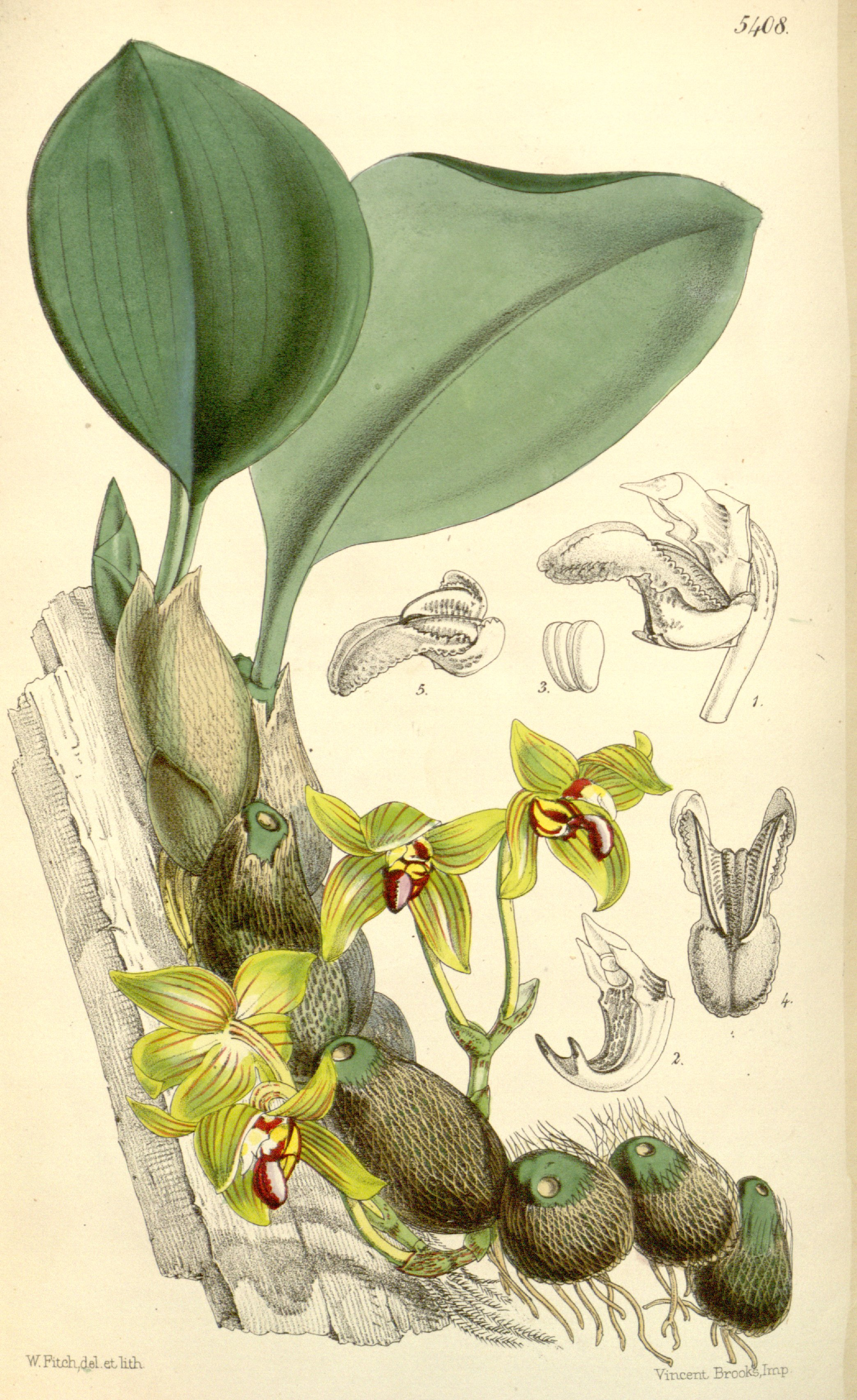

Scientific classification
- Kingdom: Plantae
- Clade: Tracheophytes
- Clade: Angiosperms
- Clade: Monocots
- Order: Asparagales
- Family: Orchidaceae
- Subfamily: Epidendroideae
- Genus: Bulbophyllum
- Species: B. psittacoglossum

Binomial name
- Bulbophyllum psittacoglossum Rchb.f.

Synonyms
- Brassavola psittacoglossa (Rchb.f.) Rollisson; Bulbophyllum affinoides Guillaumin; Phyllorkis psittacoglossa (Rchb.f.) Kuntze; Sarcopodium psittacoglossum (Rchb.f.) Rchb.f. ex Hook.

= Bulbophyllum psittacoglossum =

Species of orchid

Bulbophyllum psittacoglossum is a species of orchid in the genus Bulbophyllum. It was named (as Bolbophyllum psittacoglossum) by Heinrich Gustav Reichenbach in 1863.
