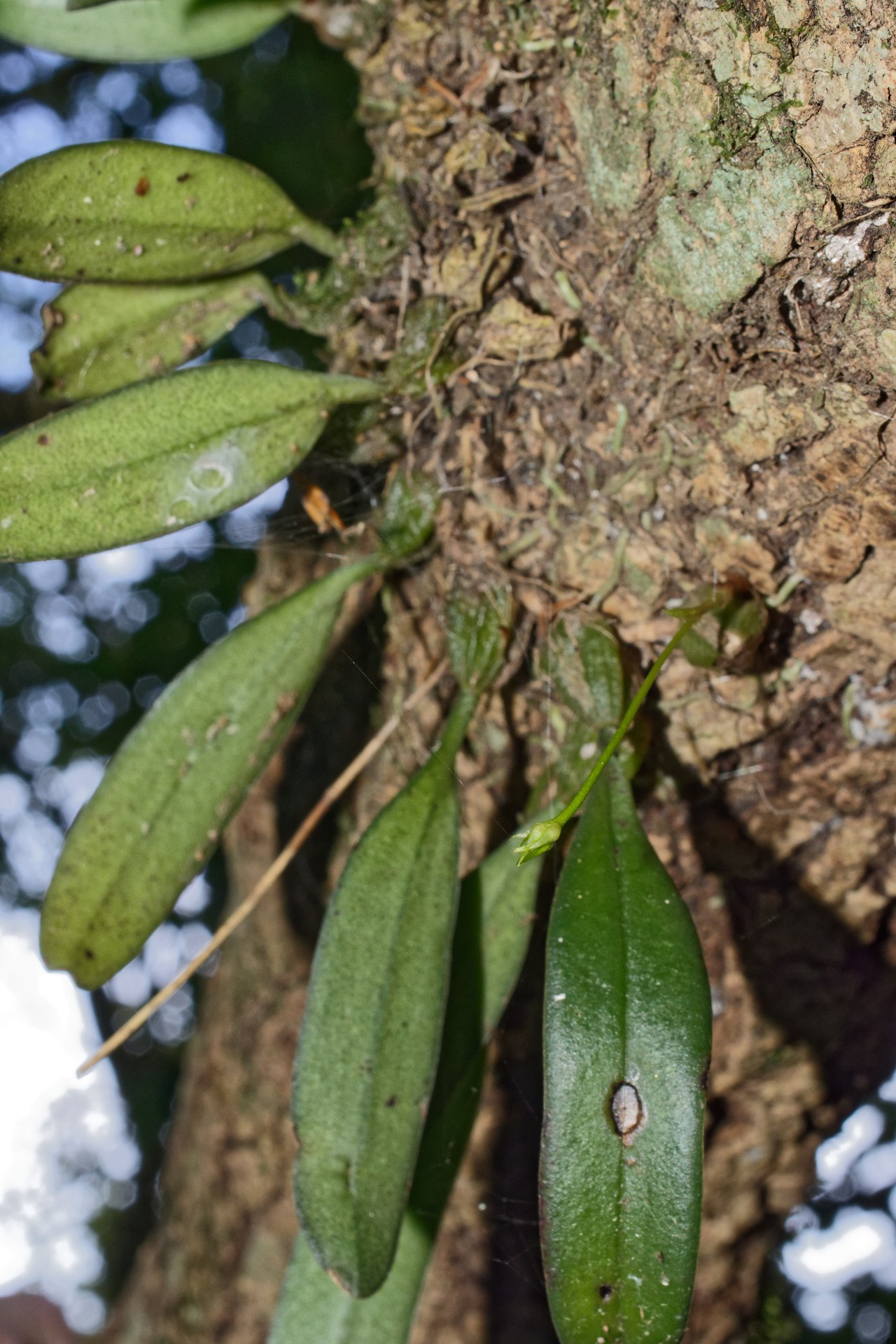

Scientific classification
- Kingdom: Plantae
- Clade: Tracheophytes
- Clade: Angiosperms
- Clade: Monocots
- Order: Asparagales
- Family: Orchidaceae
- Subfamily: Epidendroideae
- Genus: Bulbophyllum
- Species: B. setaceum

Binomial name
- Bulbophyllum setaceum T.P.Lin (1975)

Varieties
- Bulbophyllum setaceum var. confragosum (T.P.Lin & Y.N.Chang) T.P.Lin; Bulbophyllum setaceum var. setaceum

= Bulbophyllum setaceum =

Species of orchid

Bulbophyllum setaceum is a species of orchid in the genus Bulbophyllum. It is a pseudobulbous epiphyte endemic to Taiwan.

Two varieties are accepted.

- Bulbophyllum setaceum var. confragosum (T.P.Lin & Y.N.Chang) T.P.Lin (synonym Bulbophyllum confragosum T.P.Lin & Y.N.Chang)
- Bulbophyllum setaceum var. setaceum (synonyms Bulbophyllum ciliisepalum T.C.Hsu & S.W.Chung and B. taitungianum S.S.Ying)
