= Bulbophyllum proboscideum =

Scientific classification
- Kingdom: Plantae
- Clade: Tracheophytes
- Clade: Angiosperms
- Clade: Monocots
- Order: Asparagales
- Family: Orchidaceae
- Subfamily: Epidendroideae
- Genus: Bulbophyllum
- Species: B. proboscideum

Binomial name
- Bulbophyllum proboscideum (Gagnep.) Seidenf. & Smitinand

Synonyms
- Cirrhopetalum proboscideum Gagnep.; Mastigion proboscideum (Gagnep.) Garay, Hamer & Siegerist

Species of orchid

Bulbophyllum proboscideum is a flowering plant in the family Orchidaceae.
