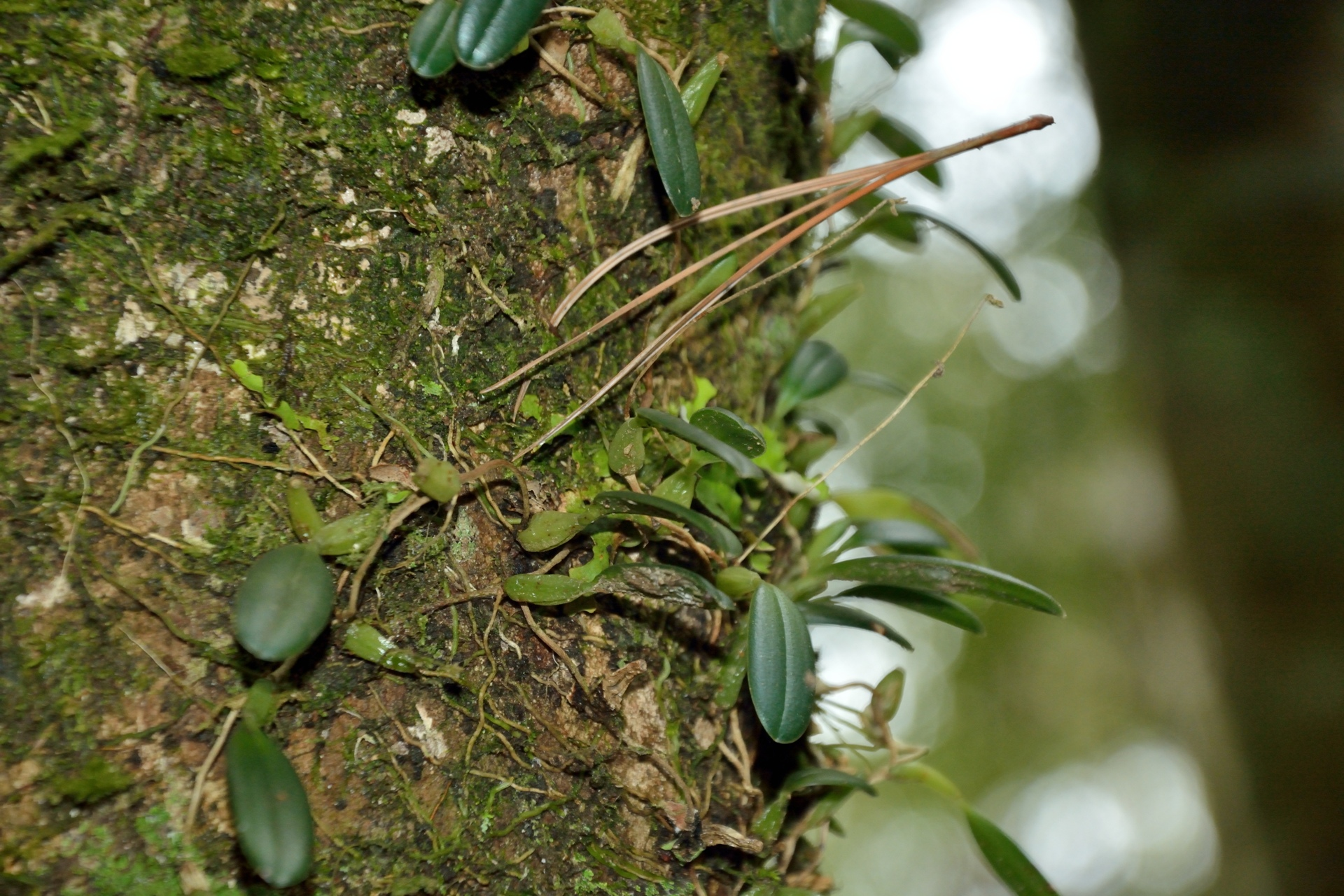

Scientific classification
- Kingdom: Plantae
- Clade: Tracheophytes
- Clade: Angiosperms
- Clade: Monocots
- Order: Asparagales
- Family: Orchidaceae
- Subfamily: Epidendroideae
- Genus: Bulbophyllum
- Species: B. albociliatum

Binomial name
- Bulbophyllum albociliatum (Tang S.Liu & H.Y.Su) K.Nakaj. (1973)

Varieties
- 4; see text

Synonyms
- Cirrhopetalum albociliatum Tang S.Liu & H.Y.Su (1971)

= Bulbophyllum albociliatum =

Species of orchid

Bulbophyllum albociliatum is a species of orchid in the genus Bulbophyllum. It is a pseudobulbous epiphyte endemic to Taiwan.

== Varieties ==
Four varieties are accepted.

- Bulbophyllum albociliatum var. albociliatum – central and southern Taiwan
- Bulbophyllum albociliatum var. remotifolium (Fukuy.) T.P.Lin – Taiwan (Hualien)
- Bulbophyllum albociliatum var. shanlinshiense T.P.Lin & Y.N.Chang – Taiwan (Nantou)
- Bulbophyllum albociliatum var. weiminianum T.P.Lin & Kuo Huang – southern Taiwan
