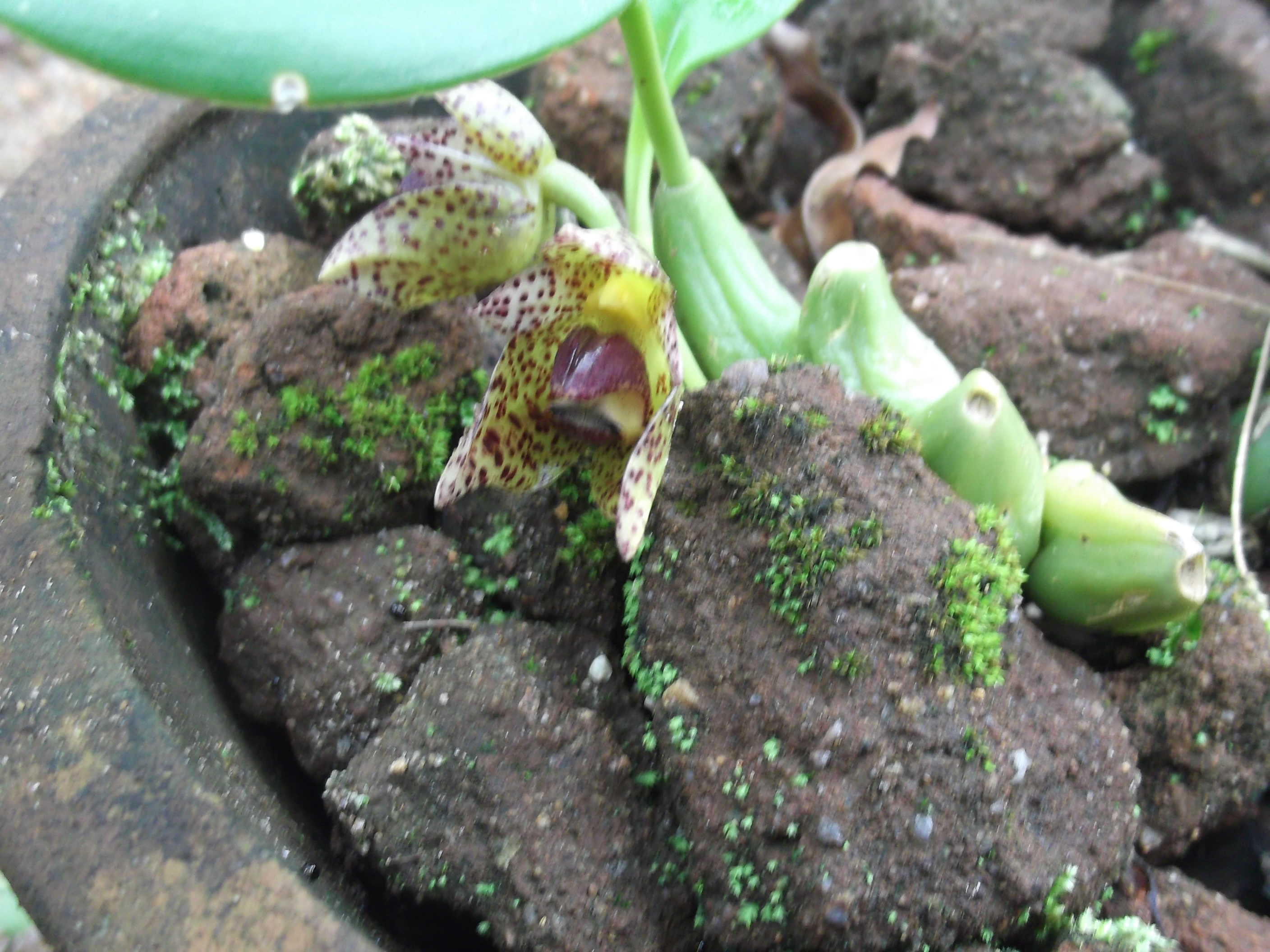

Scientific classification
- Kingdom: Plantae
- Clade: Tracheophytes
- Clade: Angiosperms
- Clade: Monocots
- Order: Asparagales
- Family: Orchidaceae
- Subfamily: Epidendroideae
- Genus: Bulbophyllum
- Species: B. leopardinum

Binomial name
- Bulbophyllum leopardinum (Wall.) Lindl. ex Wall.

Synonyms
- Bulbophyllum colomaculosum Z.H.Tsi & S.C.Chen; Dendrobium leopardinum Wall.; Phyllorkis leopardina (Wall.) Kuntze; Sarcopodium leopardinum (Wall.) Lindl. & Paxton; Bulbophyllum schmidtianum Rchb.f.

= Bulbophyllum leopardinum =

Species of orchid

Bulbophyllum leopardinum is a species of orchid in the genus Bulbophyllum.
