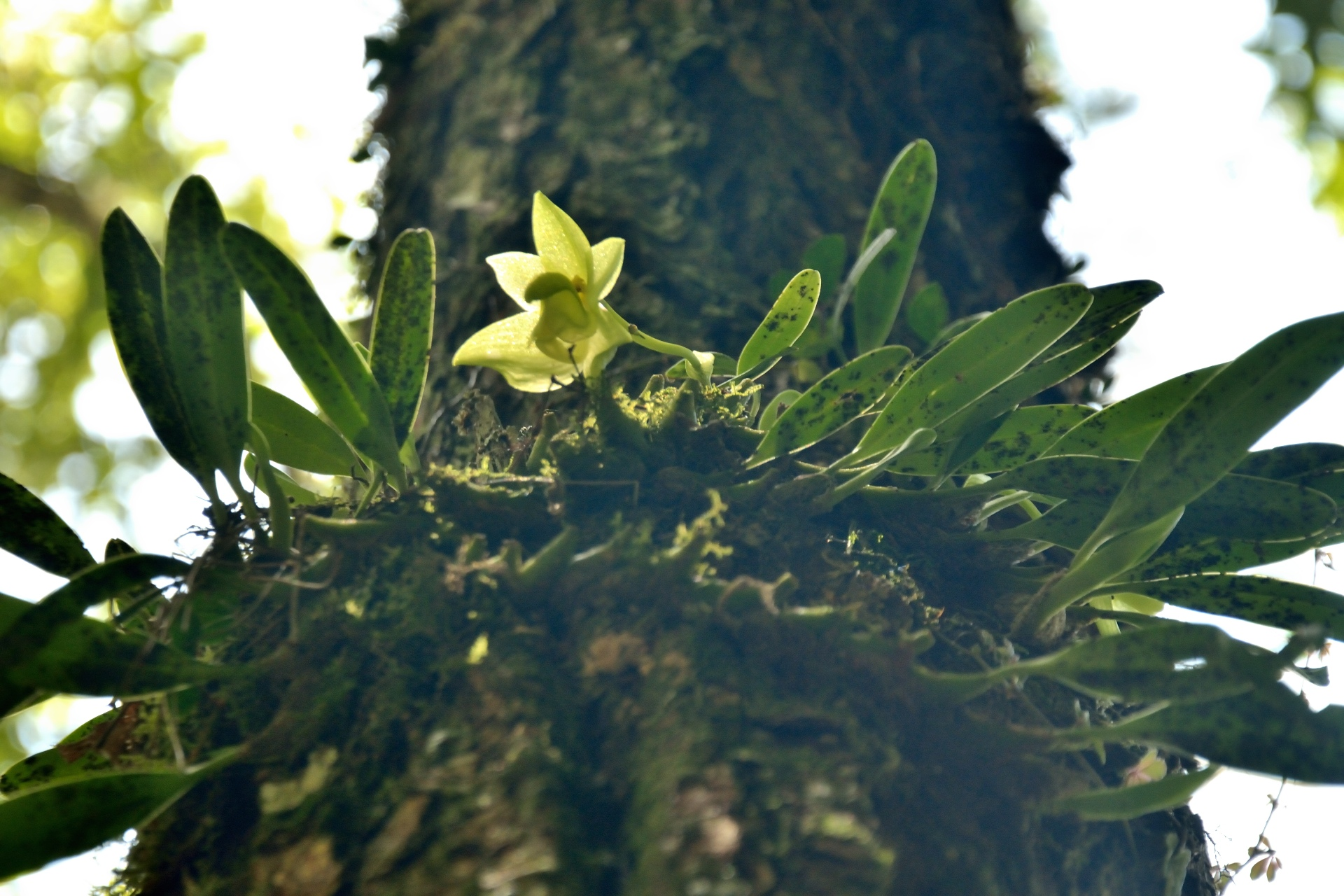

Scientific classification
- Kingdom: Plantae
- Clade: Tracheophytes
- Clade: Angiosperms
- Clade: Monocots
- Order: Asparagales
- Family: Orchidaceae
- Subfamily: Epidendroideae
- Genus: Bulbophyllum
- Species: B. pectinatum

Binomial name
- Bulbophyllum pectinatum Finet

Synonyms
- Bulbophyllum pectinatum var. transarisanense (Hayata) S.S.Ying; Bulbophyllum spectabile Rolfe; Bulbophyllum transarisanense Hayata; Bulbophyllum transarisanense f. alboviride Fukuy.; Bulbophyllum viridiflorum Hayata

= Bulbophyllum pectinatum =

Species of orchid

Bulbophyllum pectinatum is a species of orchid in the genus Bulbophyllum.
