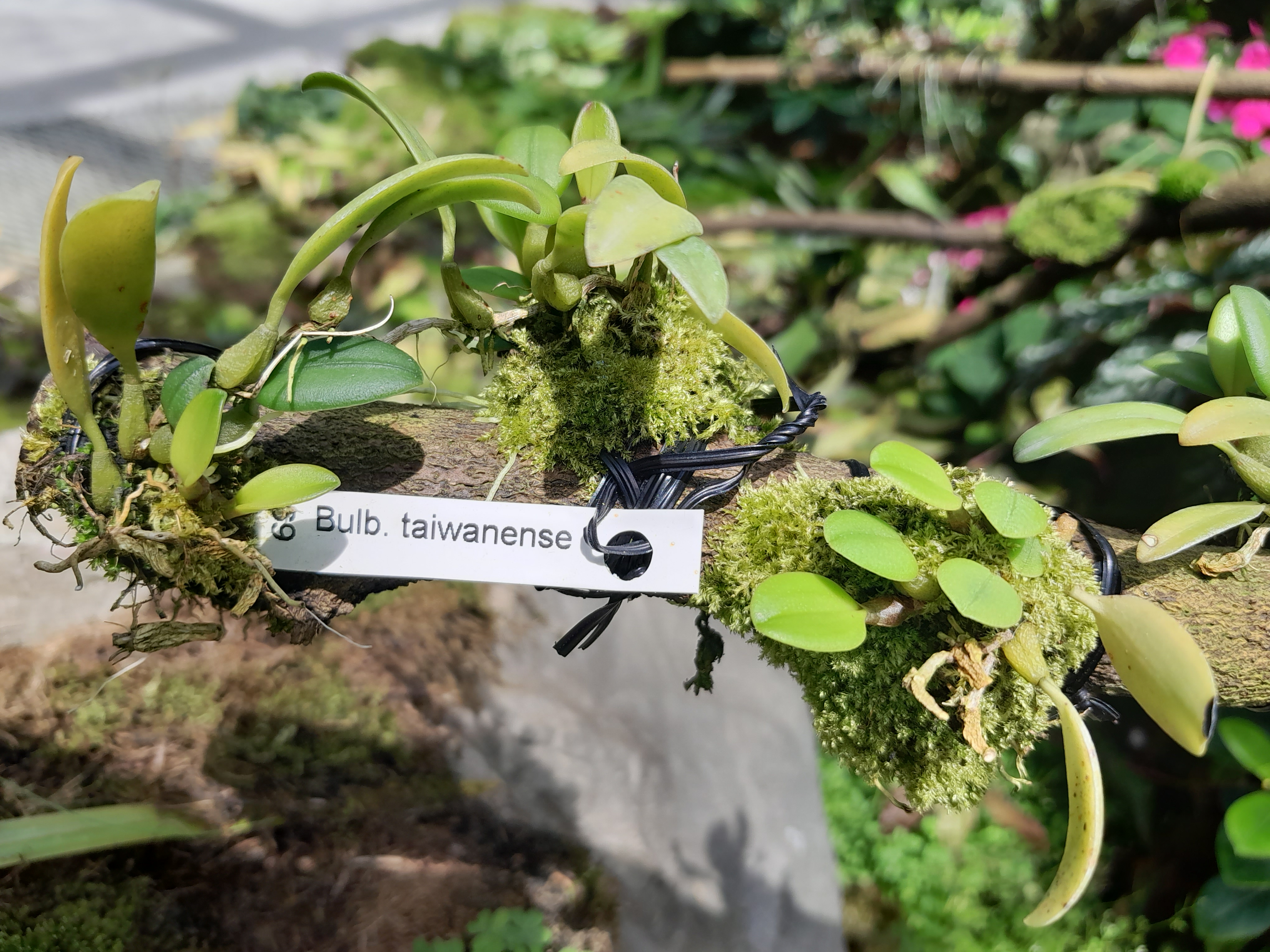

Scientific classification
- Kingdom: Plantae
- Clade: Tracheophytes
- Clade: Angiosperms
- Clade: Monocots
- Order: Asparagales
- Family: Orchidaceae
- Subfamily: Epidendroideae
- Genus: Bulbophyllum
- Species: B. taiwanense

Binomial name
- Bulbophyllum taiwanense (Fukuy.) K.Nakaj. (1973)

Synonyms
- Cirrhopetalum taiwanense Fukuy. (1935)

= Bulbophyllum taiwanense =

Species of orchid

Bulbophyllum taiwanense is a species of orchid in the genus Bulbophyllum. It is a pseudobulbous epiphyte endemic to Taiwan. Its inflorescence has 2.4-4" in length with 5-8 orange flowers, each is 1.5" in length.
