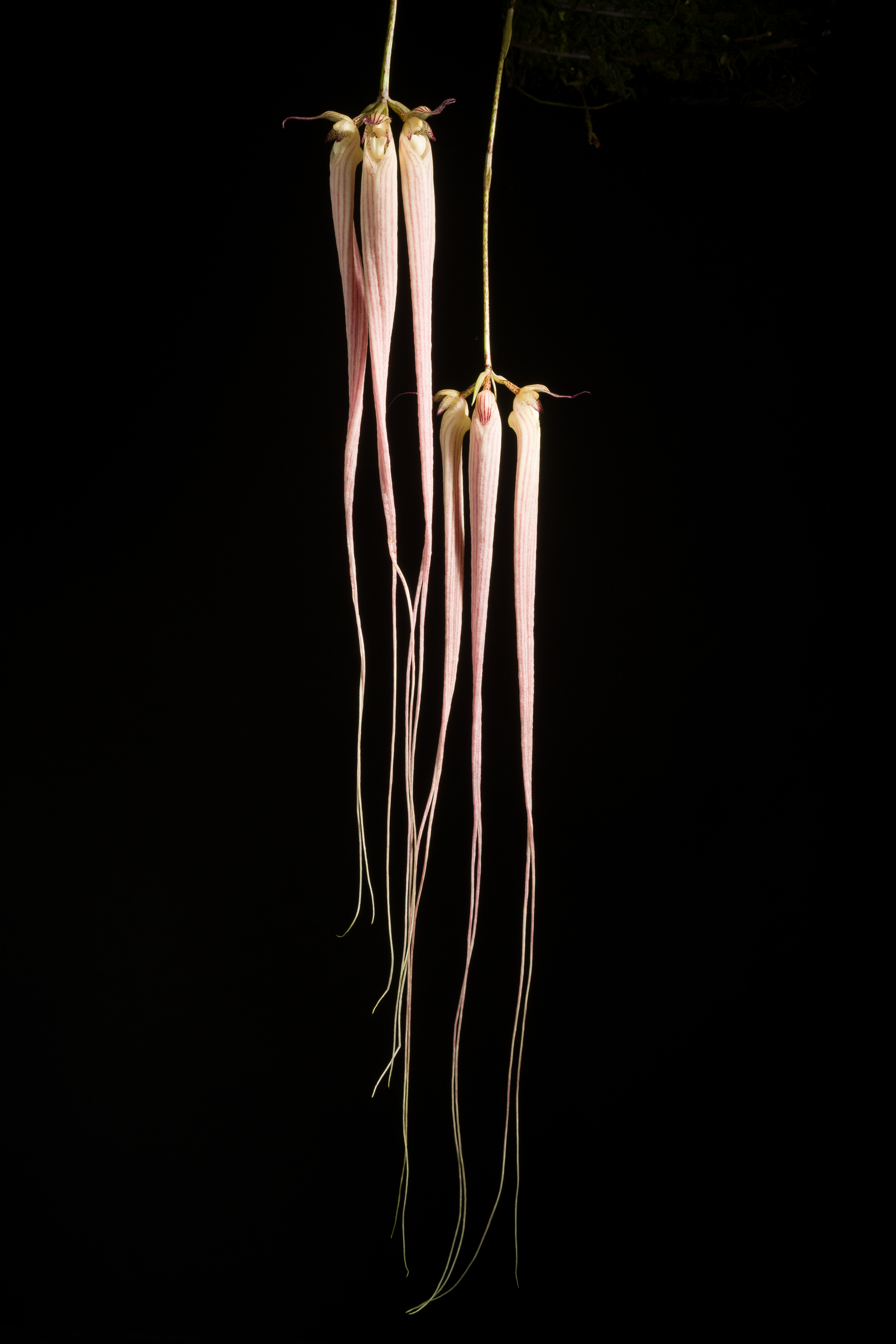

Scientific classification
- Kingdom: Plantae
- Clade: Tracheophytes
- Clade: Angiosperms
- Clade: Monocots
- Order: Asparagales
- Family: Orchidaceae
- Subfamily: Epidendroideae
- Genus: Bulbophyllum
- Species: B. longissimum

Binomial name
- Bulbophyllum longissimum (Ridl.) J.J.Sm.(1912)

Synonyms
- Cirrhopetalum longissimum Ridl. (1896)

= Bulbophyllum longissimum =

Species of orchid

Bulbophyllum longissimum is a species of orchid in the genus Bulbophyllum.

== Description ==
Plant produces pseudobulbs that are 2.5-4 cm long with a single leaf. Leaves are subsessile and leathery 9-15 cm x 2.5-4.5 cm It is most noted for its 3-7 very large flowers with pendant 20 cm long inflorescence, pale yellow to cream with red stripes or spots lateral sepals up to 30 cm (12 inches) in length growing from a peduncle. The lip is yellow. Dorsal sepal is cupped tapering at the apex and pubescent.

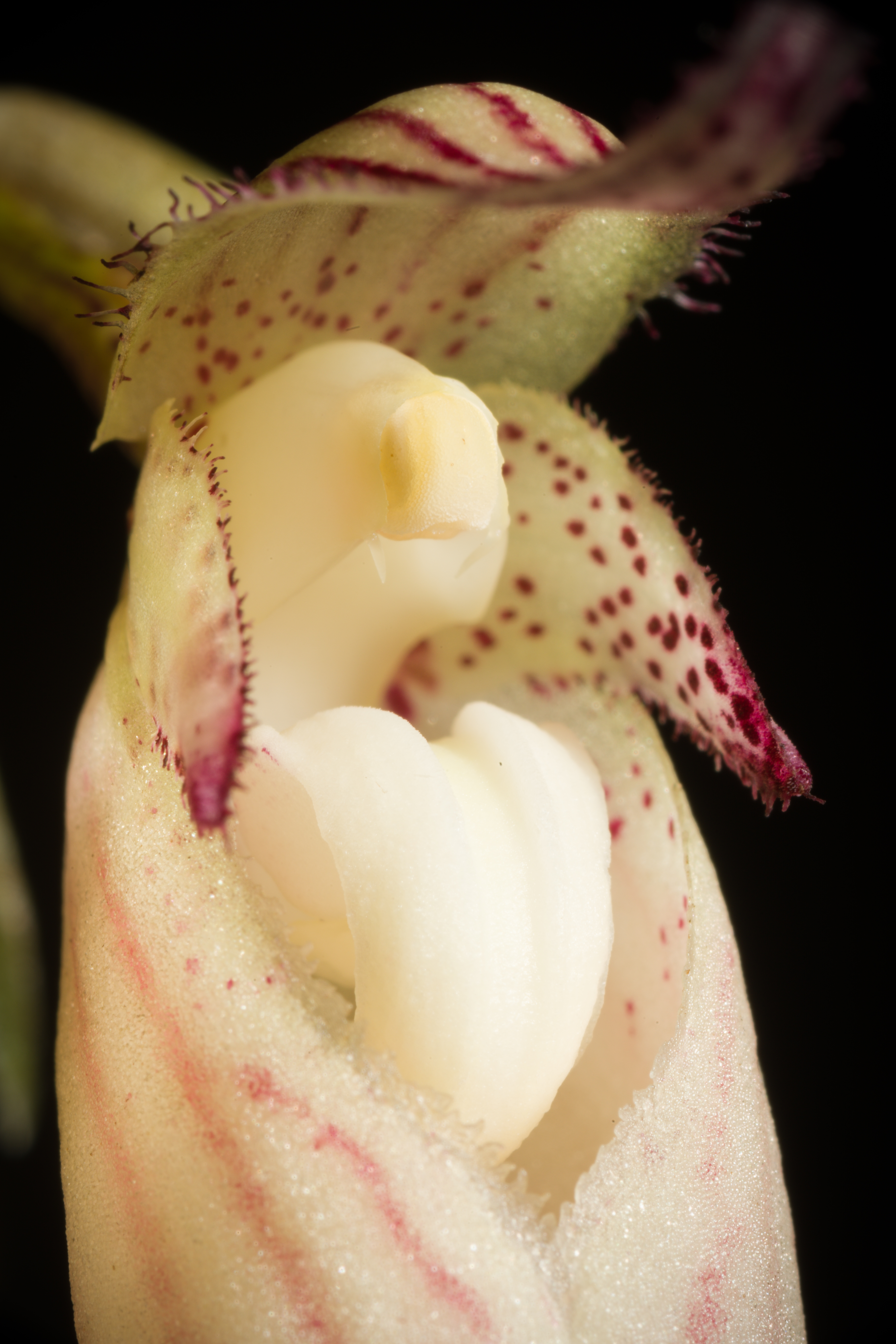
Closeup to flower

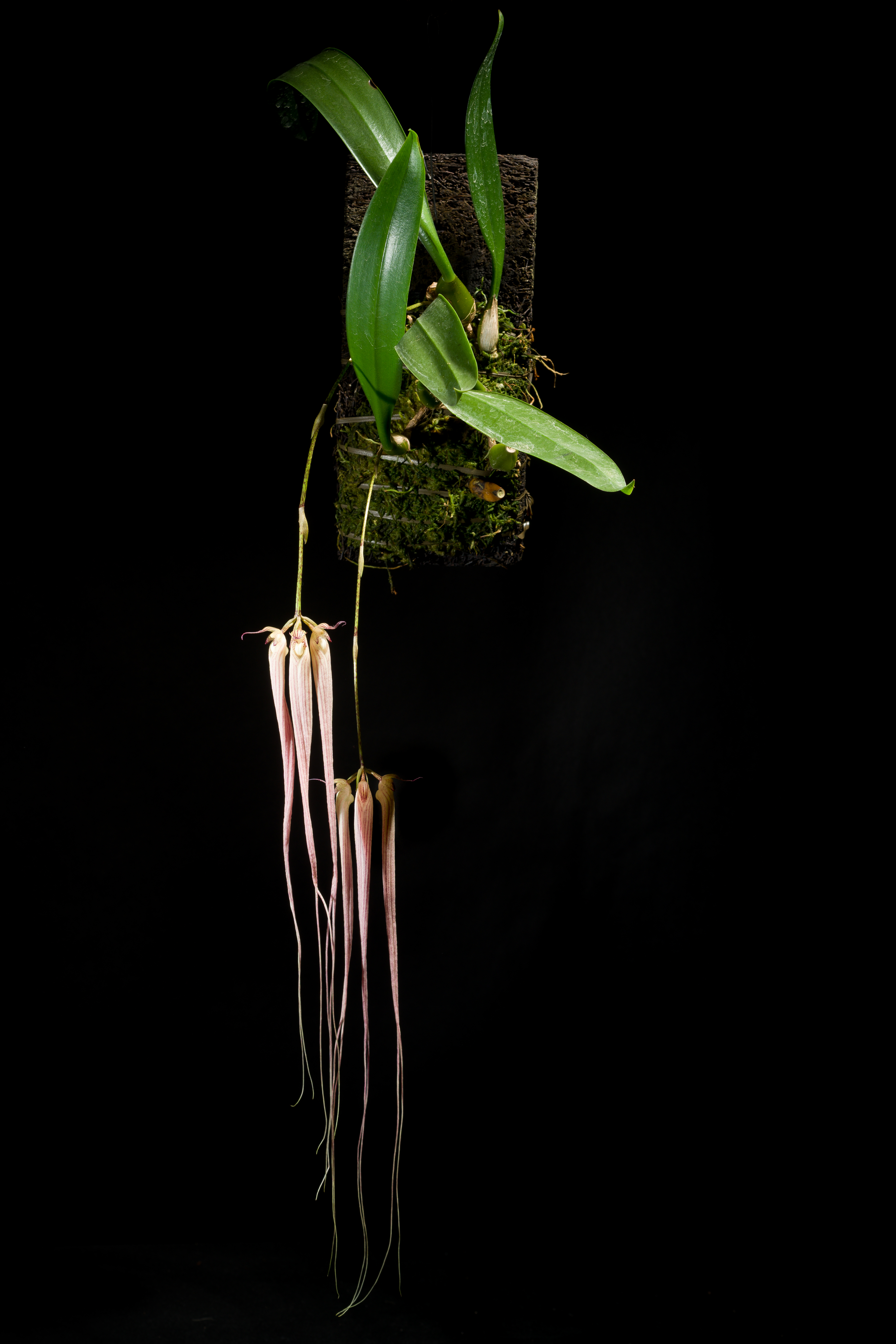
Plant

== Distribution ==
It is native to the Malay Peninsula, Thailand, Myanmar, and Borneo at low elevations.

== Sources ==
- The Bulbophyllum-Checklist
- The Internet Orchid Species Photo Encyclopedia
