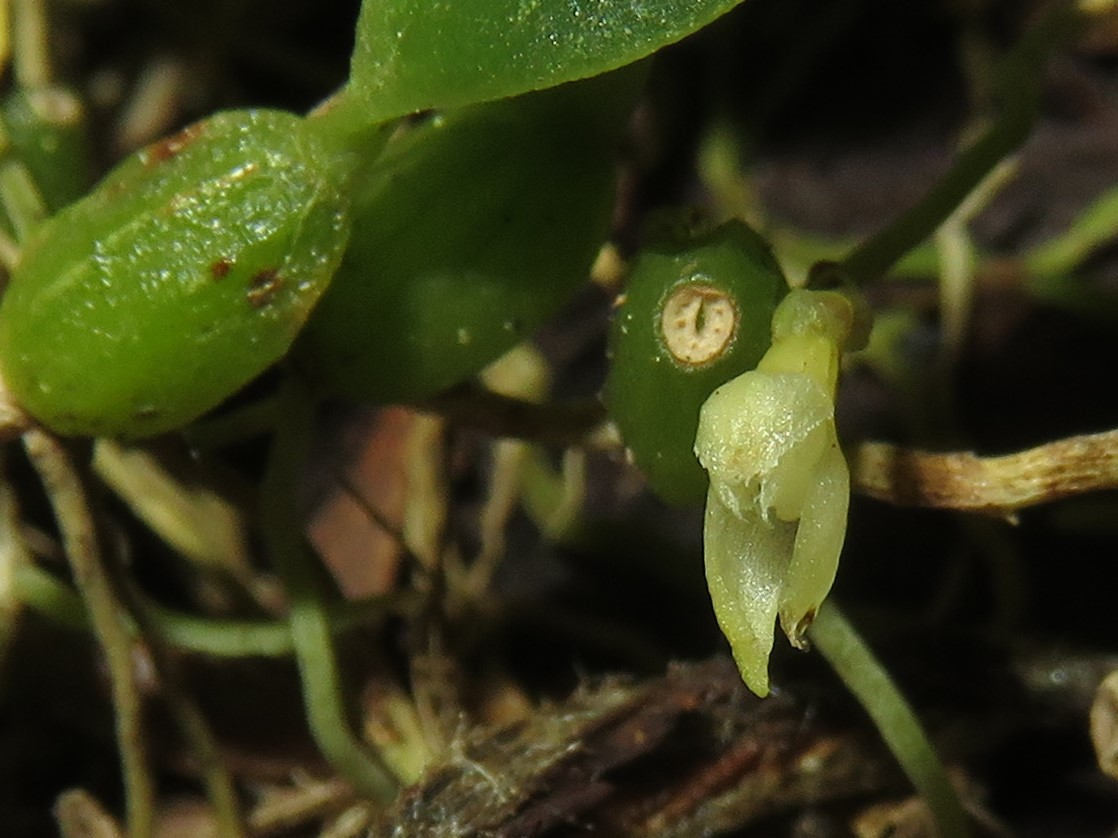

Scientific classification
- Kingdom: Plantae
- Clade: Tracheophytes
- Clade: Angiosperms
- Clade: Monocots
- Order: Asparagales
- Family: Orchidaceae
- Subfamily: Epidendroideae
- Genus: Bulbophyllum
- Species: B. inconspicuum

Binomial name
- Bulbophyllum inconspicuum Maxim.

= Bulbophyllum inconspicuum =

Inconspicuous bulbophyllum

Species of orchid

Bulbophyllum inconspicuum (inconspicuous bulbophyllum) is a species of orchid in the family Orchidaceae. It is native to Japan and Korea.
