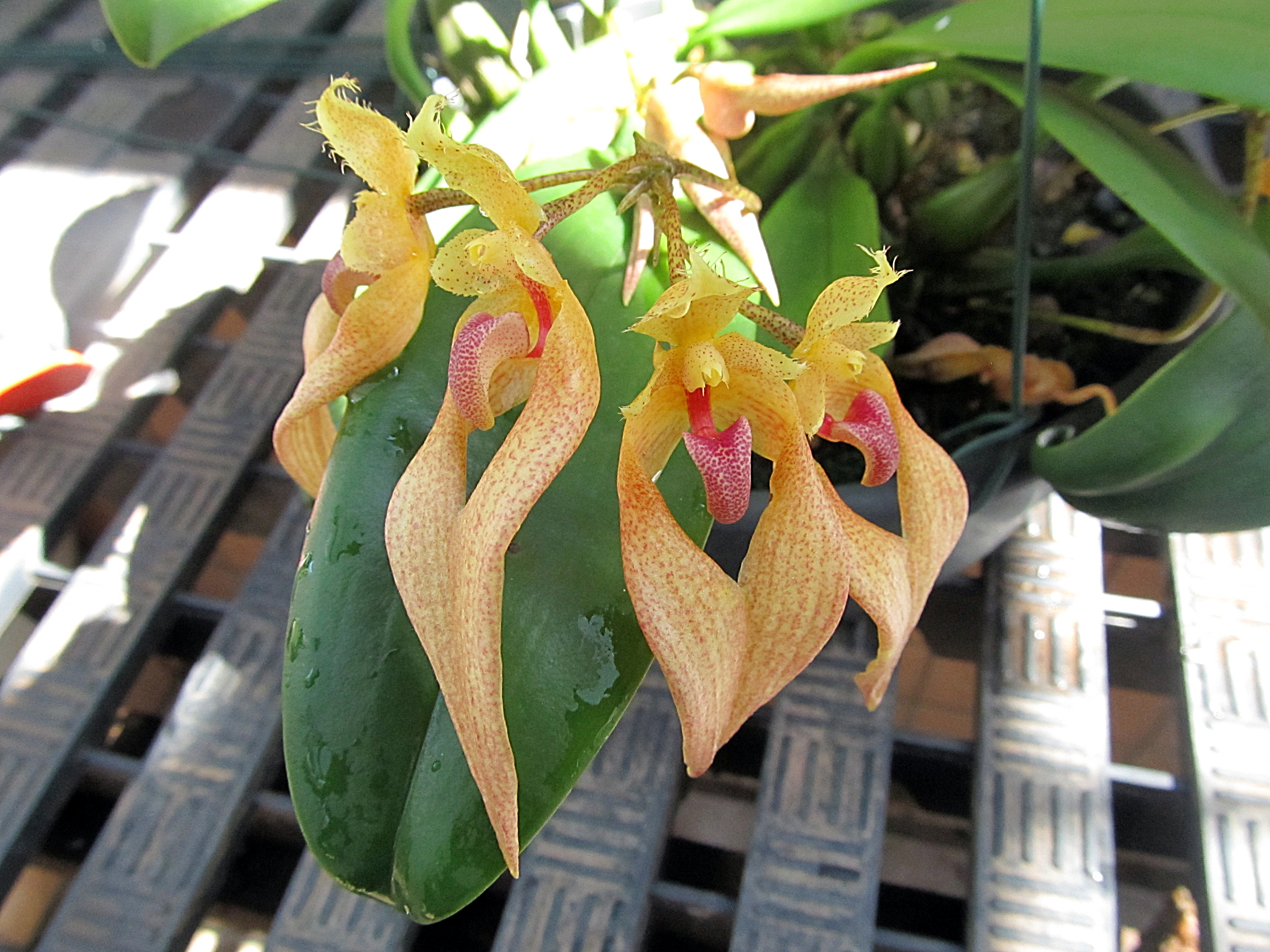

Scientific classification
- Kingdom: Plantae
- Clade: Tracheophytes
- Clade: Angiosperms
- Clade: Monocots
- Order: Asparagales
- Family: Orchidaceae
- Subfamily: Epidendroideae
- Genus: Bulbophyllum
- Species: B. bicolor

Binomial name
- Bulbophyllum bicolor Lindl.

Synonyms
- Cirrhopetalum bicolor (Lindley) Rolfe; Phyllorkis bicolor (Lindley) Kuntze

= Bulbophyllum bicolor =

Species of orchid from Asia

Bulbophyllum bicolor is a species of orchid in the genus Bulbophyllum. It is found only in Hong Kong and isolated parts of southeast China and northern Vietnam.
