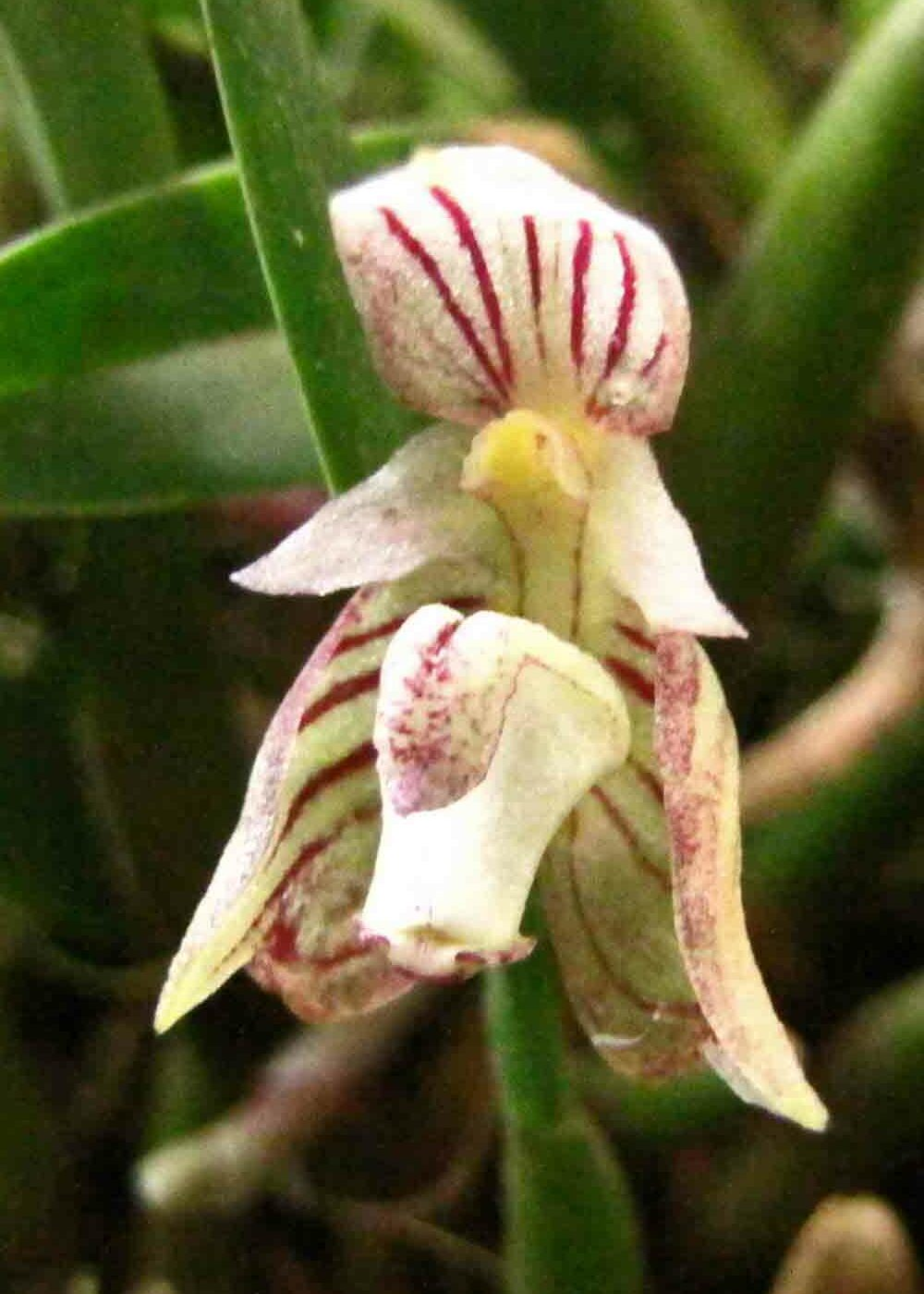

Scientific classification
- Kingdom: Plantae
- Clade: Tracheophytes
- Clade: Angiosperms
- Clade: Monocots
- Order: Asparagales
- Family: Orchidaceae
- Subfamily: Epidendroideae
- Genus: Bulbophyllum
- Species: B. ambrosia

Binomial name
- Bulbophyllum ambrosia (Hance) Schltr.

= Bulbophyllum ambrosia =

Species of orchid

Bulbophyllum ambrosia is a species of orchid in the genus Bulbophyllum. First published in 1919 in Repertorium specierum novarum regni vegetabilis Volume 4
