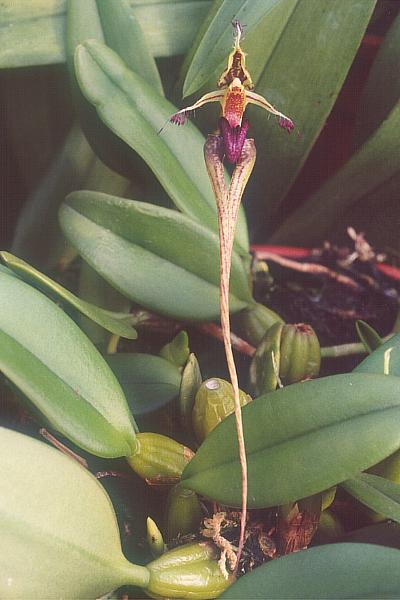

Scientific classification
- Kingdom: Plantae
- Clade: Tracheophytes
- Clade: Angiosperms
- Clade: Monocots
- Order: Asparagales
- Family: Orchidaceae
- Subfamily: Epidendroideae
- Genus: Bulbophyllum
- Species: B. putidum

Binomial name
- Bulbophyllum putidum (Teijsm. & Binn.) J.J.Sm. (1912)

Synonyms
- Cirrhopetalum putidum Teijsm. & Binn. (1862) (Basionym); Mastigion putidum (Teijsm. & Binn.) Garay, Hamer & Siegerist (1994); Cirrhopetalum appendiculatum Rolfe (1901)

= Bulbophyllum putidum =

Species of orchid

Bulbophyllum putidum is a species of orchid.
