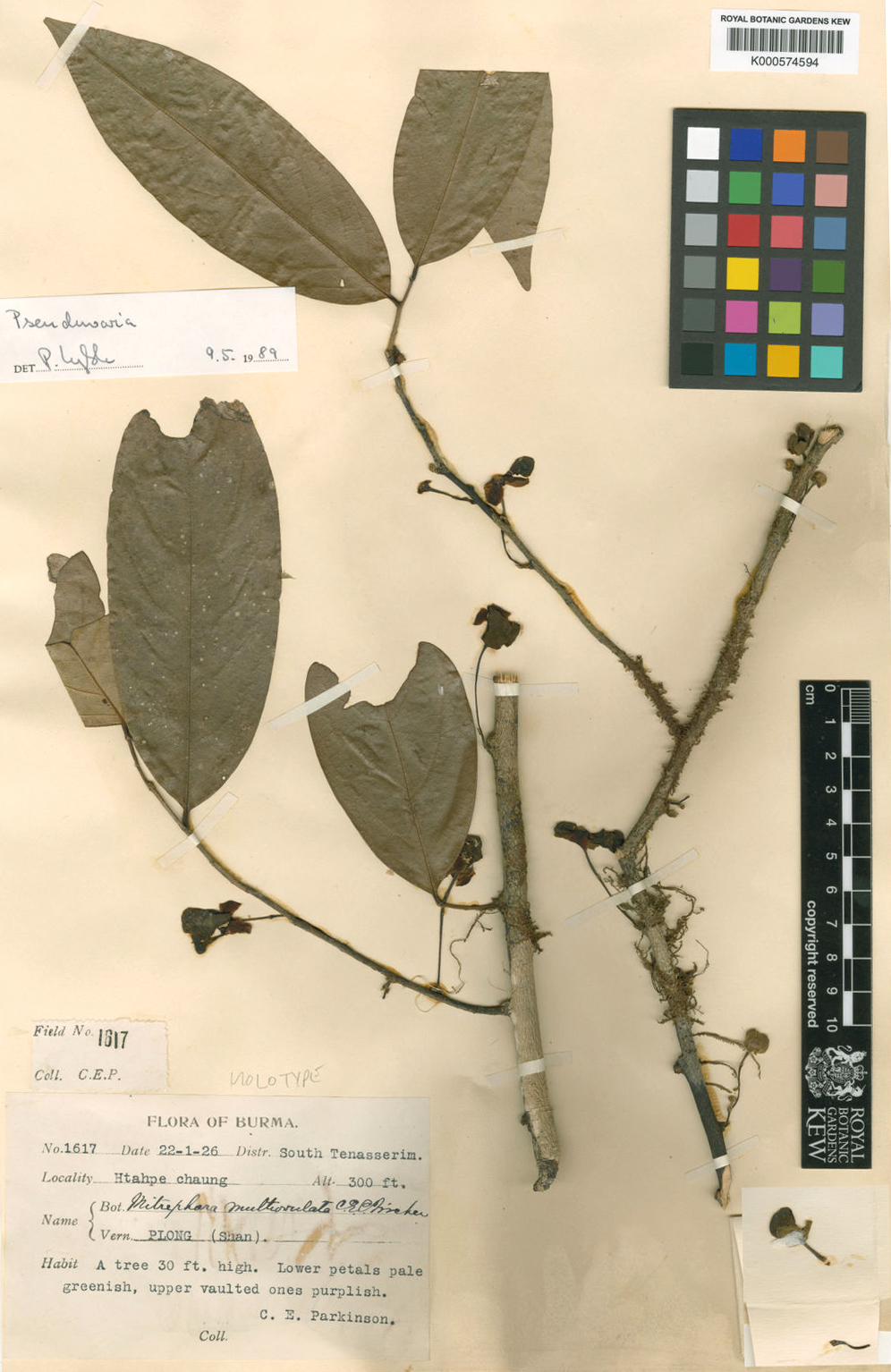
- Herbarium specimen of Pseuduvaria multiovulata

Conservation status
- Endangered (IUCN 3.1)

Scientific classification
- Kingdom: Plantae
- Clade: Embryophytes
- Clade: Tracheophytes
- Clade: Spermatophytes
- Clade: Angiosperms
- Clade: Magnoliids
- Order: Magnoliales
- Family: Annonaceae
- Genus: Pseuduvaria
- Species: P. multiovulata

Binomial name
- Pseuduvaria multiovulata (C.E.C.Fisch.) J.Sinclair

Synonyms
- Mitrephora multiovulata C.E.C.Fisch.

= Pseuduvaria multiovulata =

Species of plant in the soursop family

Pseuduvaria multiovulata is a species of plant in the family Annonaceae. It is native to Myanmar. Cecil Fischer, the Indian botanist who first formally described the species using the basionym Mitrephora multiovulata, named it after its many (multi-, in Latin) ovuled (-ovulate, in Latin) ovaries.

== Description ==
It is a small tree reaching 6 meters (20 ft) in height. The young, light brown to black branches are slightly covered in hairs and have sparse lenticels. Its elliptical, papery to slightly leathery leaves are 11–17.5 cm (4.3–6.9 in) by 3.5–7 cm (1.4–2.8 in). The leaves have pointed to blunt bases and tapering tips, with the tapering portion 5–13 millimeters long. The leaves are hairless on their upper and lower surfaces. The leaves have 10–12 pairs of secondary veins emanating from their midribs. Its slightly hairy petioles are 4–8 by 1–2.5 millimeters with a narrow groove on their upper side. Its solitary Inflorescences occur on branches, and are organized on densely hairy peduncles that are 2–4 by 0.6–1.1 millimeters. Each inflorescence has 1–2 flowers. Each flower is on a sparsely hairy pedicel that is 20–60 by 0.4–1.3 millimeters. The pedicels are organized on a rachis up to 5 millimeters long that have 3–4 bracts. The pedicels have a medial, very densely hairy bract that is 1–2 millimeters long. Its flowers are unisexual. Its flowers have 3 oval sepals, that are 2–4 by 2.5–3.5 millimeters and partially fused at their base. The sepals are hairless on their upper surface, densely hairy on their lower surface, and hairy at their margins. Its 6 petals are arranged in two rows of 3. The white, elliptical, outer petals are 7.5–11 by 5.5–8 millimeters with hairless upper and sparsely hairy lower surfaces. The purple to purple-green, diamond-shaped inner petals have a 3–9 millimeter long claw at their base and a 9–18.5 by 5.5–9.5 millimeter blade. The inner petals have pointed bases and tips. The inner petals are slightly hairy on their upper surface and densely hairy on their lower surfaces. The inner petals have two, square, smooth, prominently raised glands on their upper surface. Male flowers have 110–115 stamens that are 0.8–1.4 by 0.6–1 millimeters. Female flowers have up to 11 carpels that are 2.6–2.8 by 1.1–1.3 millimeters. Each carpel has up to 17 ovules arranged in two rows. The female flowers have up to 2 sterile stamens. The fruit occur in clusters of 1–2 that are organized on hairless peduncles that are 3.5–6 by 2–2.5 millimeters. The fruit are attached by hairless pedicles that are 26–36 by 1.5–2 millimeters. The green, mature fruit are elliptical and 25–34 by 17–27 millimeters. The fruit are smooth, and very densely hairy. Each fruit has up to 17 lens-shaped, wrinkly seeds that are 13–18.5 by 6–8.5 by 2.5–4.5 millimeters.

=== Reproductive biology ===
The pollen of P. multiovulata is shed as permanent tetrads.

== Habitat and distribution ==
It has been observed growing in lowland forests at elevations of 100–700 meters (330–2,300 ft).
