= Pseuduvaria silvestris =

Scientific classification
- Kingdom: Plantae
- Clade: Tracheophytes
- Clade: Angiosperms
- Clade: Magnoliids
- Order: Magnoliales
- Family: Annonaceae
- Genus: Pseuduvaria
- Species: P. silvestris

Binomial name
- Pseuduvaria silvestris (Diels) J.Sinclair

Synonyms
- Oreomitra bullata Diels; Orophea rhytidocarpa Diels; Orophea rhytidophylla Diels; Orophea silvestris Diels; Pseuduvaria rhytidocarpa (Diels) Sinclair ex Kessler; Pseuduvaria rhytidophylla (Diels) J.Sinclair

Species of plant in the soursop family

Pseuduvaria silvestris is a species of plant in the family Annonaceae. It is native to New Guinea. Ludwig Diels, the botanist who first formally described the species under the basionym Orophea silvestris, named it after the forested (silvestris in Latin) habitat the specimens he examined were found growing in near the Waria River.

== Description ==
It is a small tree reaching 5 meters (16 ft) in height. The young, grey-brown to black branches are densely hairy. Its elliptical to oval or egg-shaped, papery to slightly leathery leaves are 11–24.5 cm (4.3–9.6 in) by 2–7 cm (0.8–2.8 in). The leaves have heart–shaped bases and tapering tips, with the tapering portion 14–43 millimeters long. The leaves are hairless on their upper and densely hairy on their lower surfaces. The leaves have 12–22 pairs of secondary veins emanating from their midribs. Its petioles, if present, are densely hairy, 1–4 by 1–3 millimeters with a broad groove on their upper side. Its solitary Inflorescences occur on branches, and are organized on very densely hairy peduncles that are 10–18 by 0.1–0.5 millimeters. Each inflorescence has 1–2 flowers. Each flower is on a very densely hairy pedicel that is 3–7 by 0.2–0.4 millimeters. The pedicels are organized on a rachis up to 5 millimeters long that have 5–7 bracts. The pedicels have a medial, very densely hairy bract that is 0.3 millimeters long. It has male and hermaphroditic flowers, but the latter are poorly described in the literature. Its flowers have 3 triangular sepals that are partially fused at their base. The sepals are 0.2 by 0.7 millimeters. The sepals are hairless on their upper surface, densely hairy on their lower surface, and hairy at their margins. Its 6 petals are arranged in two rows of 3. The dark purple to red, circular, outer petals are 0.7 by 0.9 millimeters with hairless upper and very densely hairy lower surfaces. The dark purple to dull red, diamond-shaped inner petals have a 0.6 millimeter long claw at their base and a 2–3 by 1.5–2.5 millimeter blade. The inner petals have pointed bases and tips. The inner petals are slightly hairy on their upper surfaces and very densely hairy on their lower surfaces. Male flowers have up to 29 stamens that are 0.4–0.6 by 0.4–0.5 millimeters. The fruit occur in clusters of 1–2 on densely hairy pedicles that are 5–12 by 0.5–1.5 millimeters. The pedicels are attached to a densely hairy peduncle that is 10–21 by 0.5–1 millimeters. The orange, globe-shaped to elliptical fruit are 8–28 by 6–27 millimeters. The fruit are smooth, and very densely hairy. Each fruit has up to 5 hemispherical to lens-shaped seeds that are 8–9.5 by 5–8 by 3.5–5 millimeters, arranged in two rows. The seeds are wrinkly.

=== Reproductive biology ===
The pollen of P. silvestris is shed as permanent tetrads.

== Habitat and distribution ==
It has been observed growing in lowland forests at elevations of 60–600 meters (200–1,970 ft).
