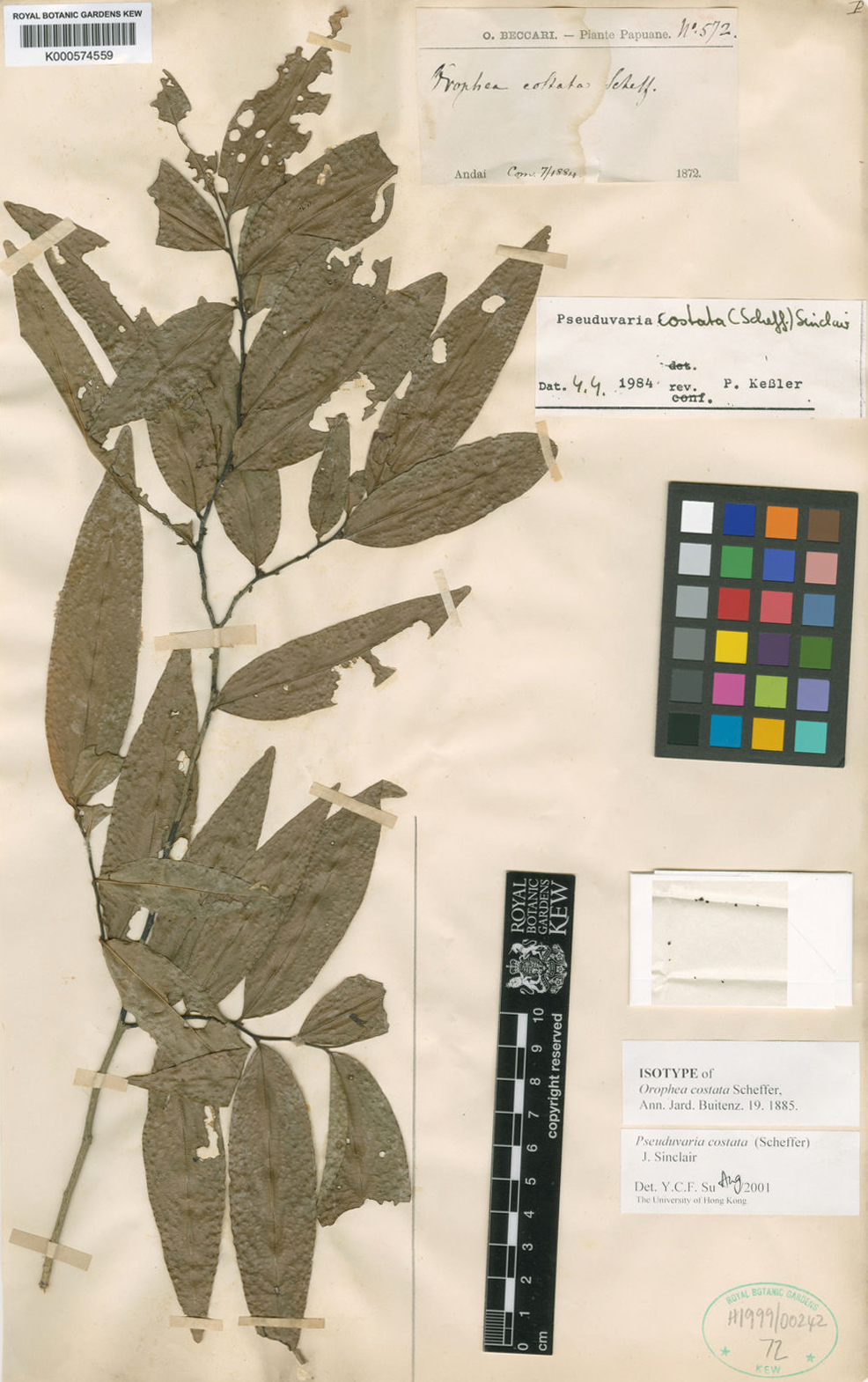
- Herbarium specimen of Pseuduvaria costata

Scientific classification
- Kingdom: Plantae
- Clade: Tracheophytes
- Clade: Angiosperms
- Clade: Magnoliids
- Order: Magnoliales
- Family: Annonaceae
- Genus: Pseuduvaria
- Species: P. costata

Binomial name
- Pseuduvaria costata (Scheff.) J.Sinclair

Synonyms
- Orophea costata Scheff.

= Pseuduvaria costata =

Species of plant in the soursop family

Pseuduvaria costata is a species of plant in the family Annonaceae. It is native to New Guinea. Rudolph Scheffer, the Dutch botanist who first formally described the species using the basionym Orophea costata, named it after its prominently ribbed (costatus in Latin) fruit.

== Description ==
It is a tree reaching 0.6 meters (2.0 ft) in height. Its oval to elliptical, moderately leathery leaves are 9–22.5 cm (3.5–8.9 in) by 2.5–5 cm (1.0–2.0 in). The leaves have pointed to wedge-shaped bases and pointed to tapering tips, with the tapering portion 4-20 millimeters long. The leaves are hairless on their upper and lower surfaces except for the midrib which can be sparsely hairy. The leaves have 10-22 pairs of secondary veins emanating from their midribs. Its sparsely hairy petioles are 3–7 by 1-2.5 millimeters with a narrow groove on their upper side. Its Inflorescences occur in pairs and are organized on short peduncles. Each inflorescence has a solitary flower. Each flower is on a sparsely hairy pedicel that are 1-1.5 by 0.5 millimeters. The flowering pedicel has a medial, sparsely hairy bract that is 0.5 millimeters long. The flowers are unisexual or hermaphroditic. Its flowers have 3 triangular sepals, that are 0.5 by 0.5 millimeters. The sepals are hairless on their upper surface, sparsely hairy on their lower surface, and have fine hairs on their margins. Its 6 petals are arranged in two rows of 3. The oval to elliptical, outer petals are 0.8-1 by 1 millimeters with hairless upper surfaces and sparsely hairy lower surfaces. The diamond-shaped inner petals have a 0.5 millimeter long claw at their base and a 1 by 1 millimeter blade. The inner petals have pointed tips and bases. The upper surface of the inner petals is smooth except for the tip which is hairy. The lower surfact of the inner petals is densely covered in hairs except near the claw. Male flowers have up to 18 stamens that are 0.3 by 0.3-0.4 millimeters. Hermaphroditic flowers have up to 6 stamens and 1 carpels. Each carpel has 8 ovules arranged in two rows. Fruit are on sparsely hairless pedicels that are 2–5 by 1-2.5 millimeters. The mature fruit are ellipsoidal to circular and 17–23 by 11-18 millimeters. The mature orange fruit have many prominent ridges and can be hairless or densely covered in fine hairs. Each fruit has around 2-8 seeds arranged in two rows. The wrinkled, hemi-spherical seeds are 6–9 by 4.5-5.5 by 2.5-4 millimeters.

=== Reproductive biology ===
The pollen of P. coriacea is shed as permanent tetrads.

== Habitat and distribution ==
It has been observed growing in clay soils, in secondary forests, at elevations from 30 to 50 meters (98 to 160 ft).
