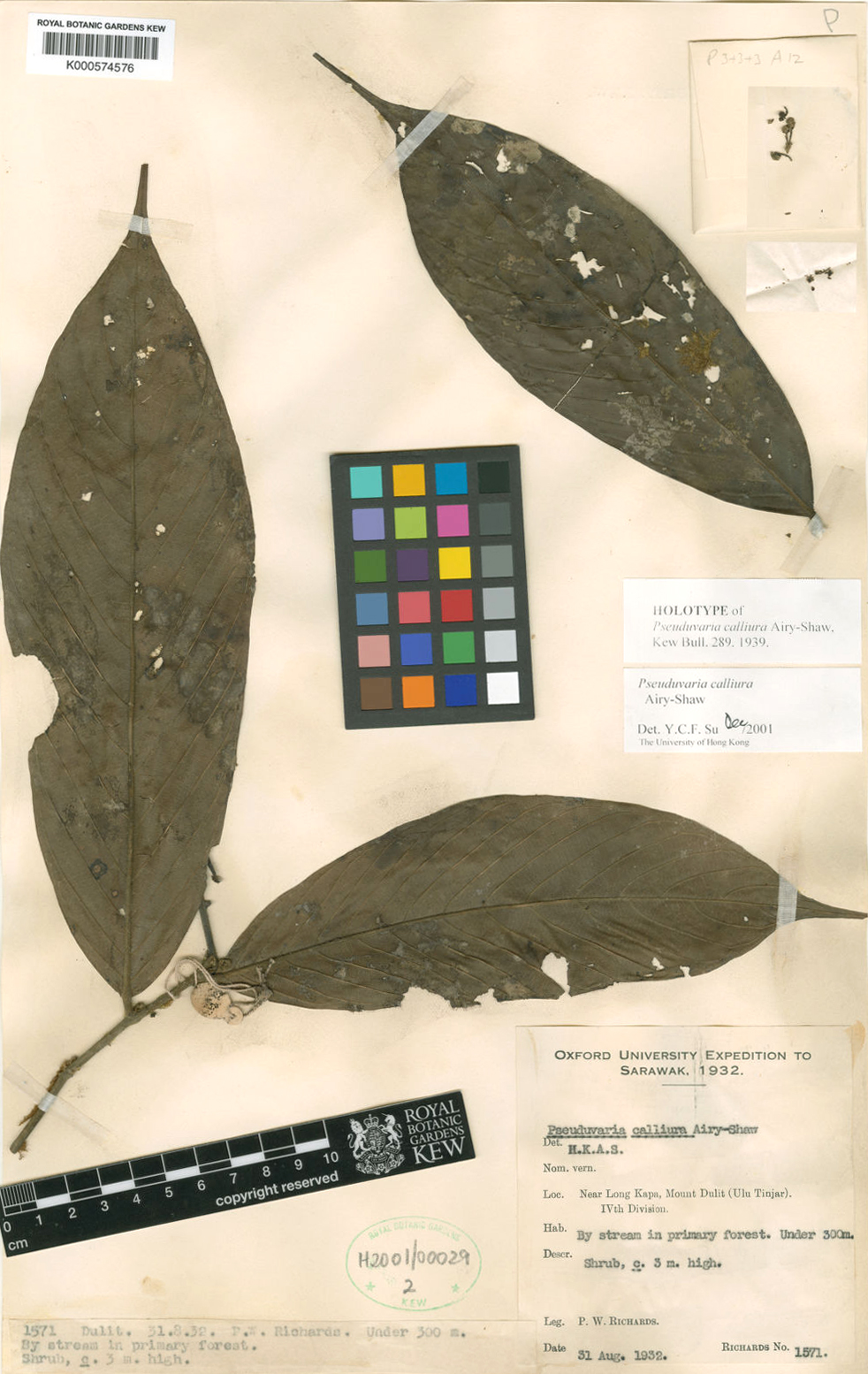
- Herbarium specimen of Pseuduvaria calliura

Conservation status
- Endangered (IUCN 3.1)

Scientific classification
- Kingdom: Plantae
- Clade: Embryophytes
- Clade: Tracheophytes
- Clade: Spermatophytes
- Clade: Angiosperms
- Clade: Magnoliids
- Order: Magnoliales
- Family: Annonaceae
- Genus: Pseuduvaria
- Species: P. calliura

Binomial name
- Pseuduvaria calliura Airy Shaw

= Pseuduvaria calliura =

Species of plant in the soursop family

Pseuduvaria calliura is a species of plant in the family Annonaceae. It is endemic to Borneo. Herbert Kenneth Airy Shaw, the English botanist who first formally described the species, named it after the beautiful tails (Latinized forms of Greek καλλι, calli-; and ουρα, ura) or tips of its leaves.

== Description ==
It is a tree reaching 10 meters (33 ft) in height. Its branches have sparse lenticels. Its mildly leathery leaves are 15.5–19 cm (6.1–7.5 in) by 4.5–6.5 cm (1.8–2.6 in). The tips of the leaves come to a distinctive 35–50 millimeter long point. The leaves are hairless on their upper surface and densely hairy on their lower surface. The leaves have 12–16 pairs of secondary veins emanating from their midribs. Its densely hairy petioles are 4–8 millimeters long with a groove on their upper side. Inflorescences are organized on short, inconspicuous peduncles. Each inflorescence has 1 flower. Each flower is on a densely hairy pedicel 4–8 millimeters in length. The flowers unisexual. Its flowers have 3 sepals, 0.7–1 by 1–1.5 millimeters, that are partially fused at their base. The sepals are smooth on their upper surface, sparsely hairy on their lower surface, and have fine hairs on their margins. Its 6 petals are arranged in two rows of 3. The outer oval-shaped petals are 1.5 by 1.5–2 millimeters with smooth upper surfaces and sparsely hairy lower surfaces. The inner petals have a 2 millimeter long claw at their base and a 3.5–4 by 2.5–3 millimeter blade. The inner petals are sparsely hairy on their upper surface and densely hairy on their lower surface. Each inner petal has a horizontal, rod-shaped gland at the base of its outer surface. Male flowers have up to 24 stamens that are 0.6–0.7 millimeters long. Fruit are on sparsely hairy pedicels 7–12 millimeters in length. The fruit consists of up to 7 monocarps. Each mature monocarp is a 9–13 by 10 millimeter globe. The mature monocarps are green, wrinkly and hairy.

=== Reproductive biology ===
The pollen of P. calliura is shed as permanent tetrads.
