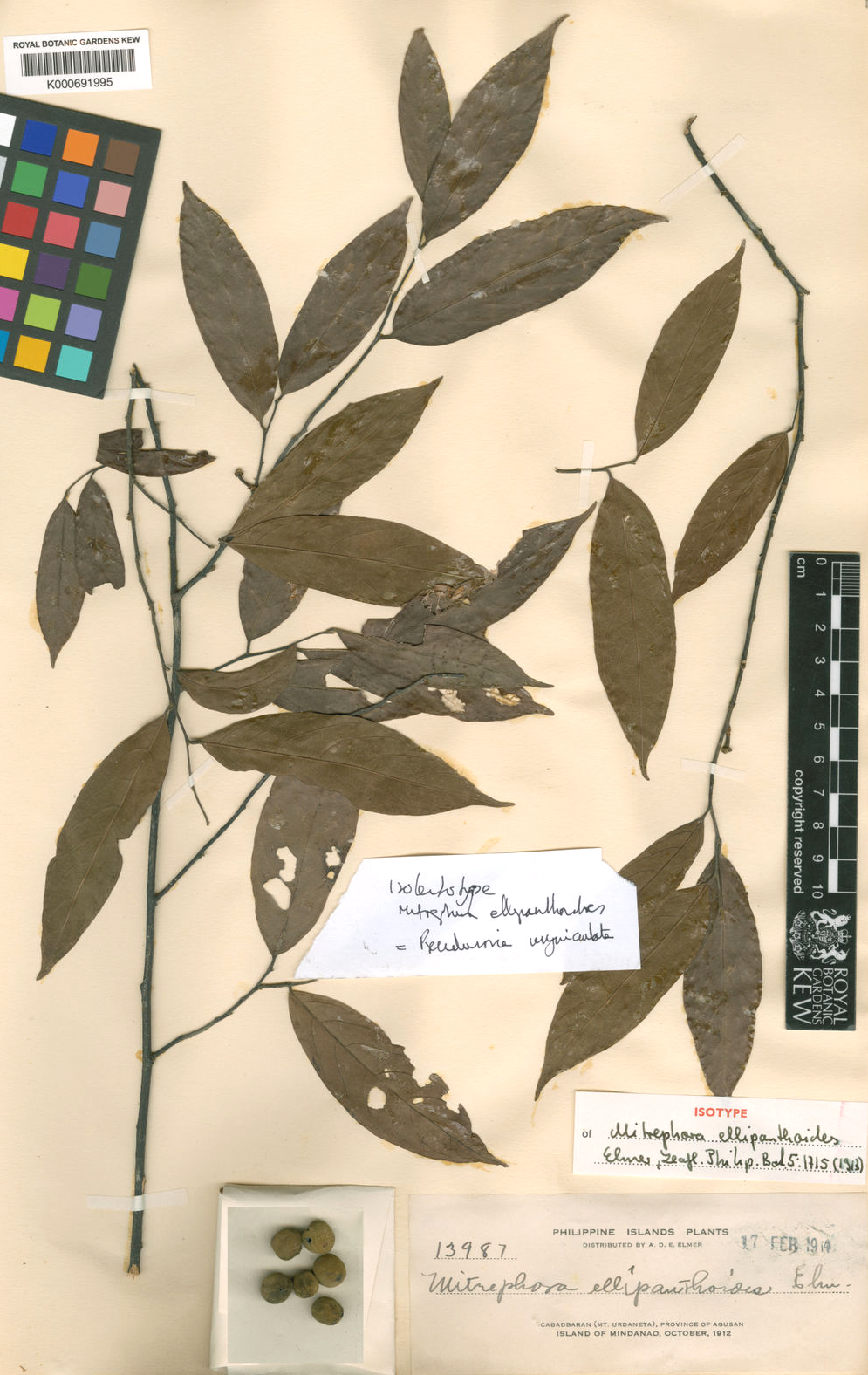
- Herbarium specimen of Pseuduvaria unguiculata.

Conservation status
- Endangered (IUCN 3.1)

Scientific classification
- Kingdom: Plantae
- Clade: Embryophytes
- Clade: Tracheophytes
- Clade: Spermatophytes
- Clade: Angiosperms
- Clade: Magnoliids
- Order: Magnoliales
- Family: Annonaceae
- Genus: Pseuduvaria
- Species: P. unguiculata

Binomial name
- Pseuduvaria unguiculata (Elmer) Y.C.F.Su & R.M.K.Saunders

Synonyms
- Mitrephora ellipanthoides Elmer; Orophea ellipanthoides (Elmer) Merr.; Orophea unguiculata Elmer; Pseuduvaria caudata Merr.

= Pseuduvaria unguiculata =

Species of plant in the soursop family

Pseuduvaria unguiculata is a species of flowering plant in the family Annonaceae. It is endemic to the Philippines. Adolph Daniel Edward Elmer, the American botanist who first formally described the species, named it after its clawed (unguiculatus in Latin) inner petals.

== Description ==
It is a tree reaching 8 meters (26 ft) in height. The young, gray to black branches are slightly hairy. Its egg-shaped to elliptical, papery to leathery leaves are 7–14 cm (2.8–5.5 in) by 2–6 cm (0.8–2.4 in). The leaves have pointed to drawn-out bases and tapering tips, with the tapering portion 6–20 millimeters long. The leaves are hairless. The leaves have 8–14 pairs of secondary veins emanating from their midribs. Its hairless to slightly hairy petioles are 4–10 by 0.8–2 millimeters with a broad groove on their upper side. Its solitary or paired Inflorescences occur on branches, and are organized on indistinct peduncles. Each inflorescence has 1 flower. Each flower is on a very densely hairy pedicel that is 5–8 by 0.4–0.7 millimeters. The pedicels are organized on a rachis up to 5 millimeters long that have up to 3 bracts. The pedicels have a medial, very densely hairy bract that is up to 0.5–1 millimeter long. Its flowers are unisexual. Its flowers have 3 free, triangular sepals, that are 0.7–1.5 by 0.7–1.5 millimeters. The sepals are hairless on their upper surface, densely hairy on their lower surface, and hairy at their margins. Its 6 petals are arranged in two rows of 3. The green to pale yellow, circular to elliptical, outer petals are 1–2.5 by 1–2.5 millimeters with nearly hairless upper and very densely hairy lower surfaces. The green to pale yellow, heart-shaped to triangular inner petals have a 2.5–5.5 millimeter long claw at their base and a 4–7.5 by 3–4.5 millimeter blade. The inner petals have heart-shaped to flat bases and tapering to pointed tips. The inner petals are densely hairy on their upper and lower surfaces. The male flowers have 42–48 stamens that are 0.6–0.8 by 0.3–0.6 millimeters. Female flowers have 5–7 carpels that are 1.5–2 by 0.7–1 millimeters. Each carpel has up to 2–7 ovules arranged in two rows. The female flowers have 2–6 sterile stamen. The fruit occur in clusters of 2–3 are organized on indistinct peduncles. The fruit are attached by nearly hairless pedicles that are 4–7 by 1–1.5 millimeters. The yellow, globe-shaped fruit are 10–12 by 10 millimeters. The fruit are smooth, and nearly hairless. Each fruit has up to 3–6 hemispherical to lens-shaped, wrinkly seeds that are 6.5–8 by 3.5–5 by 2.5–4 millimeters. Each seed has a 1–1.5 by 0.5–1 millimeter elliptical hilum. The seeds are arranged in two rows in the fruit.

=== Reproductive biology ===
The pollen of P. unguiculata is shed as permanent tetrads.

== Habitat and distribution ==
It has been observed growing in dry loose soil in dense forests on steep ravines at elevations of 80–500 meters (260–1,600 ft).
