= Pseuduvaria galeata =

Conservation status
- Endangered (IUCN 3.1)

Scientific classification
- Kingdom: Plantae
- Clade: Tracheophytes
- Clade: Angiosperms
- Clade: Magnoliids
- Order: Magnoliales
- Family: Annonaceae
- Genus: Pseuduvaria
- Species: P. galeata

Binomial name
- Pseuduvaria galeata J.Sinclair

Species of tree

Pseuduvaria galeata is a species of plant in the family Annonaceae. It is a tree endemic to Peninsular Malaysia. James Sinclair, the Scottish botanist who first formally described the species, named it after the dome formed by inner petals shaped like a helmet (galeata in Latin).

== Description ==
It is a tree reaching 8 meters in height. The young, yellow to brown branches are very densely hairy, but become hairless with maturity. Its elliptical, papery to slightly leathery leaves are 8.5-17.5 by 3–6.5 centimeters. The leaves have wedge-shaped to rounded bases and tapering tips, with the tapering portion 3-14 millimeters long. The leaves are hairless except for the midribs which are slightly hairy on their upper side and very densely hairy on their underside. The leaves have 10-16 pairs of secondary veins emanating from their midribs. Its very densely hairy petioles are 3-8 by 1–2.5 millimeters with a broad groove on their upper side. Its solitary Inflorescences occur on branches, and are organized on indistinct peduncles. Each inflorescence has up to 1-2 flowers. Each flower is on a very densely hairy pedicel that is 10-25 by 0.6-1.1 millimeters. The pedicels are organized on a rachis up to 5 millimeters long that have 2 bracts. The pedicels have a medial, very densely hairy bract that is 1-2 millimeters long. Its flowers are unisexual. Its flowers have 3 free, triangular sepals, that are 2–3.5 by 3-3.5 millimeters. The sepals are hairless on their upper surface, densely hairy on their lower surface, and hairy at their margins. Its 6 petals are arranged in two rows of 3. The pink, egg-shaped to elliptical, outer petals are 3.5-7 by 3–5.5 millimeters with hairless upper and very densely hairy lower surfaces. The pink, diamond-shaped inner petals have a 7-9 millimeter long claw at their base and a 12-13 by 5.5-9 millimeter blade. The inner petals have pointed bases and tips. The inner petals are sparsely hairy on their upper surfaces and densely hairy on lower surfaces. The male flowers have up to 103-111 stamens that are 1.2-1.4 by 0.5-0.7 millimeters. The female flowers have up to 24 carpels that are 1.8-2.1 by 0.7-1 millimeters. Each carpel has 3-4 ovules arranged in two rows. The female flowers have up to 14 sterile stamen. The fruit occur in clusters of 12-22 that are organized on indistinct peduncles. The fruit are attached by densely hairy pedicles that are 16-26 by 1–2.5 millimeters. The green, globe-shaped fruit are 7-14 by 5-13 millimeters. The fruit have a 0.1-0.7 pointed tip. The fruit are smooth, and densely hairy. Each fruit has up to 3 hemispherical to lens-shaped, wrinkly seeds that are 8-9 by 6.5-8 by 4-6 millimeters. Each seed has a 1-1.2 by 0.6-0.8 millimeter elliptical hilum. The seeds are arranged in two rows in the fruit.

=== Reproductive biology ===
The pollen of P. galeata is shed as permanent tetrads.

== Habitat and distribution ==
It has been observed growing in peat soils in swamp and dry forests on slopes and hills at elevations up to 500 meters.
