= Pseuduvaria prainii =

Conservation status
- Vulnerable (IUCN 2.3)

Scientific classification
- Kingdom: Plantae
- Clade: Embryophytes
- Clade: Tracheophytes
- Clade: Spermatophytes
- Clade: Angiosperms
- Clade: Magnoliids
- Order: Magnoliales
- Family: Annonaceae
- Genus: Pseuduvaria
- Species: P. prainii

Binomial name
- Pseuduvaria prainii (King) Merr.

Synonyms
- Mitrephora prainii King

Species of flowering plant

Pseuduvaria prainii is a species of flowering plant in the family Annonaceae. It is endemic to the Andaman and Nicobar Islands. It is threatened by habitat loss.
