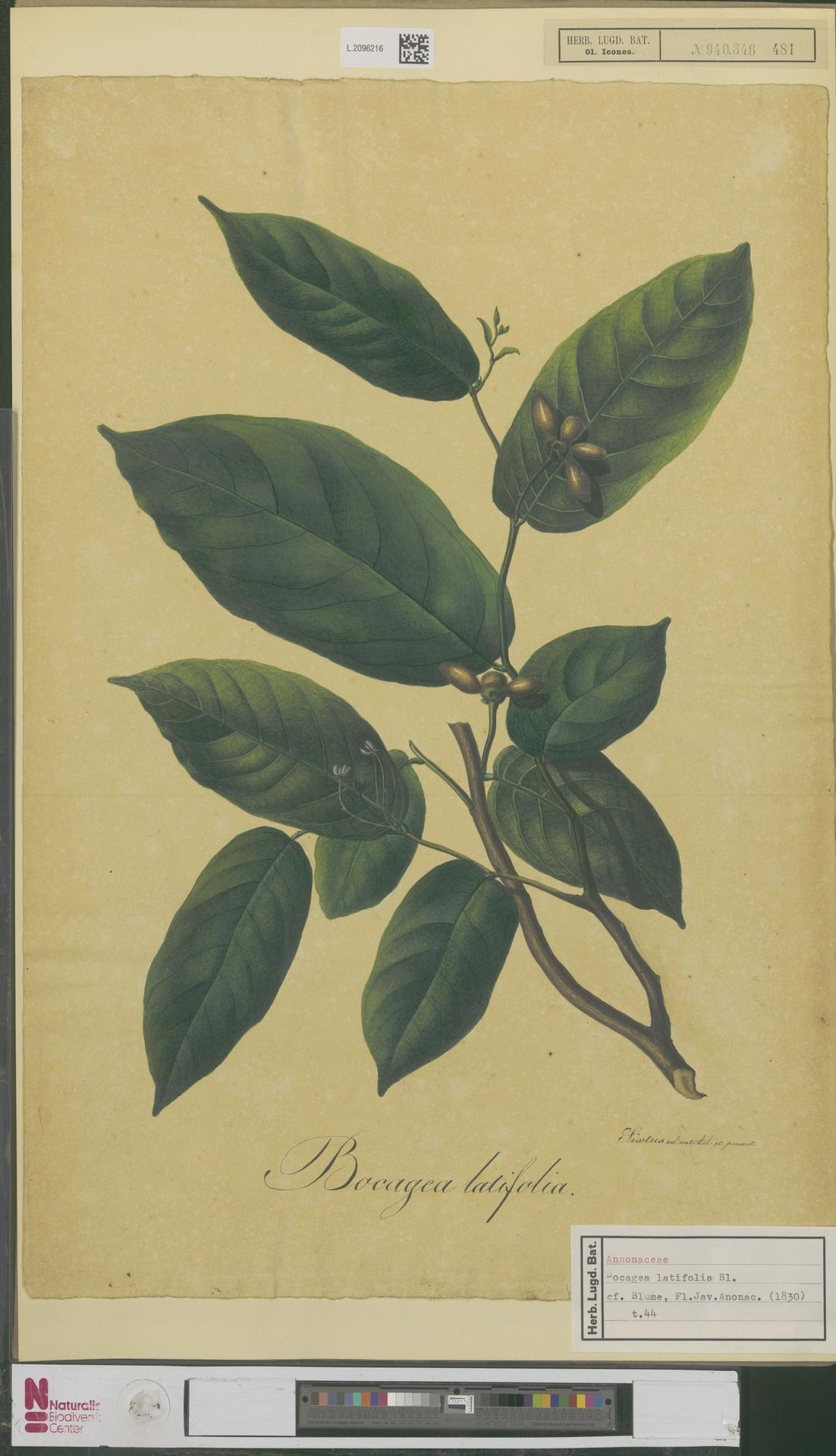
- P. latifolia artwork

Scientific classification
- Kingdom: Plantae
- Clade: Embryophytes
- Clade: Tracheophytes
- Clade: Spermatophytes
- Clade: Angiosperms
- Clade: Magnoliids
- Order: Magnoliales
- Family: Annonaceae
- Tribe: Miliuseae
- Genus: Pseuduvaria; Miq.

Synonyms
- Craibella R.M.K.Saunders, Y.C.F.Su & Chalermglin; Oreomitra Diels; Petalolophus K.Schum.

= Pseuduvaria =

Genus of plants

Pseuduvaria is a genus of the plant family Annonaceae and tribe Miliuseae, native to tropical Asia.

== Species ==
61 species are accepted.

- Pseuduvaria acerosa Y.C.F.Su & R.M.K.Saunders
- Pseuduvaria aurantiaca (Miq.) Merr.
- Pseuduvaria beccarii (Scheff.) J.Sinclair
- Pseuduvaria borneensis Y.C.F.Su & R.M.K.Saunders
- Pseuduvaria brachyantha Y.C.F.Su & R.M.K.Saunders
- Pseuduvaria bruneiensis Y.C.F.Su & R.M.K.Saunders
- Pseuduvaria calliura Airy Shaw
- Pseuduvaria cerina J.Sinclair – Malaysian endemic
- Pseuduvaria clemensiae Y.C.F.Su & R.M.K.Saunders
- Pseuduvaria coriacea Y.C.F.Su & R.M.K.Saunders
- Pseuduvaria costata (Scheff.) J.Sinclair
- Pseuduvaria cymosa (J.Sinclair) Y.C.F.Su & R.M.K.Saunders
- Pseuduvaria dielsiana (Lauterb.) J.Sinclair
- Pseuduvaria dolichonema (Diels) J.Sinclair
- Pseuduvaria filipes (K.Schum. & Lauterb.) J.Sinclair
- Pseuduvaria fragrans Y.C.F.Su, Chaowasku & R.M.K.Saunders
- Pseuduvaria froggattii (F.Muell.) Jessup – Queensland tropical rain forests endemic, Australia
- Pseuduvaria galeata J.Sinclair – Malaysian endemic
- Pseuduvaria gardneri Y.C.F.Su, Chaowasku & R.M.K.Saunders
- Pseuduvaria glabrescens (Jessup) Y.C.F.Su & R.M.K.Saunders
- Pseuduvaria glossopetala Y.C.F.Su & R.M.K.Saunders
- Pseuduvaria grandifolia (Warb.) J.Sinclair
- Pseuduvaria hylandii Jessup – Queensland tropical rain forests endemic, Australia
- Pseuduvaria khaosokensis Yoosukkee & Chaowasku
- Pseuduvaria kingiana Y.C.F.Su & R.M.K.Saunders
- Pseuduvaria kwangtungensis (P.T.Li) Qing L.Wang & B.Xue
- Pseuduvaria latifolia (Blume) Bakh.f.
- Pseuduvaria lignocarpa J.Sinclair
- Pseuduvaria livingstoneana Sukd.Bera & Karthig.
- Pseuduvaria luzoniensis (Merr.) Y.C.F.Su & R.M.K.Saunders
- Pseuduvaria macgregorii Merr.
- Pseuduvaria macrocarpa (Burck) Y.C.F.Su & R.M.K.Saunders
- Pseuduvaria macrophylla Oliv. Merr
- Pseuduvaria megalopus (K.Schum.) Y.C.F.Su & Mols
- Pseuduvaria mindorensis Y.C.F.Su & R.M.K.Saunders
- Pseuduvaria mollis (Warb.) J.Sinclair
- Pseuduvaria monticola J.Sinclair
- Pseuduvaria mulgraveana Jessup – Queensland tropical rain forests endemic, Australia
  - var. glabrescens Jessup – Queensland tropical rain forests endemic, Australia
- Pseuduvaria multiovulata (C.E.C.Fisch.) J.Sinclair
- Pseuduvaria nova-guineensis J.Sinclair
- Pseuduvaria obliqua Y.C.F.Su & R.M.K.Saunders
- Pseuduvaria oxycarpa (Boerl. ex Koord.-Schum.) Y.C.F.Su & R.M.K.Saunders
- Pseuduvaria pamattonis (Miq.) Y.C.F.Su & R.M.K.Saunders
- Pseuduvaria parviflora (Jovet-Ast) Bân
- Pseuduvaria parvipetala Y.C.F.Su & R.M.K.Saunders
- Pseuduvaria philippinensis Merr.
- Pseuduvaria phuyensis (R.M.K.Saunders, Y.C.F.Su & Chalermglin) Y.C.F.Su & R.M.K.Saunders
- Pseuduvaria prainii (King) Merr. – Indian endemic
- Pseuduvaria pulchella (Diels) J.Sinclair. – Malaysian endemic
- Pseuduvaria reticulata (Blume) Miq.
- Pseuduvaria rugosa (Blume) Merr.
- Pseuduvaria sessilicarpa (J.Sinclair) Y.C.F.Su & R.M.K.Saunders
- Pseuduvaria sessilifolia J.Sinclair
- Pseuduvaria setosa (King) J.Sinclair
- Pseuduvaria silvestris (Diels) J.Sinclair
- Pseuduvaria subcordata Y.C.F.Su & R.M.K.Saunders
- Pseuduvaria taipingensis J.Sinclair
- Pseuduvaria trimera (Craib) Y.C.F.Su & R.M.K.Saunders – S. China, Burma, Thailand, Vietnam
- Pseuduvaria unguiculata (Elmer) Y.C.F.Su & R.M.K.Saunders
- Pseuduvaria villosa Jessup – Queensland tropical rain forests endemic, Australia
