= Pseuduvaria macgregorii =

Scientific classification
- Kingdom: Plantae
- Clade: Tracheophytes
- Clade: Angiosperms
- Clade: Magnoliids
- Order: Magnoliales
- Family: Annonaceae
- Genus: Pseuduvaria
- Species: P. macgregorii

Binomial name
- Pseuduvaria macgregorii Merr.

Species of plant in the soursop family

Pseuduvaria macgregorii is a species of plant in the family Annonaceae. It is native to The Philippines. Elmer Drew Merrill, the American botanist who first formally described the species, named it after Richard MacGregor the Australian ornithologist and plant collector who collected the specimen Merrill examined.

== Description ==
It is a small tree reaching 6 meters (20 ft) in height. The young, light brown to gray branches are very densely hairy, but become hairless when mature. Its elliptical to egg-shaped, papery to leathery leaves are 18.5–36 cm (7.3–14.2 in) by 9–15 cm (3.5–5.9 in). The leaves have blunt bases and tapering tips, with the tapering portion 7–14 millimeters long. The leaves are hairless on their upper and lower surfaces except on their midribs which are sparsely to densely hairy. The leaves have 20–26 pairs of secondary veins emanating from their midribs. Its very densely hairy petioles are 6–13 by 2–5 millimeters with a broad groove on their upper side. Its Inflorescences occur in clusters of 2–7 on branches, and are organized on indistinct peduncles. Each inflorescence has up to 14 flowers. Each flower is on a very densely hairy pedicel that is 5–12 by 0.3–0.8 millimeters. The pedicels are organized on a rachis up to 5 millimeters long that have 4–14 bracts. The pedicels have a medial, very densely hairy bract that is 0.5–1.5 millimeters long. Its flowers are unisexual. Its flowers have 3 free, triangular sepals, that are 0.8–1 by 1 millimeters. The sepals are hairless on their upper surface, very densely hairy on their lower surface, and hairy at their margins. Its 6 petals are arranged in two rows of 3. The white to pink, oval, outer petals are 1.5–3 by 2–2.5 millimeters with hairless upper surfaces and densely hairy lower surfaces. The white to pink, triangular inner petals have a 1 millimeter long claw at their base and a 3 by 1.5–3 millimeter blade. The inner petals have falt bases and pointed tips. The inner petals are hairless on their upper surfaces, and slightly hairy on their lower surfaces. Male flowers have 42–45 stamens that are 0.6–0.7 by 0.6 millimeters. The fruit occur in clusters of 3–6 on slightly hairy pedicles that are 17–25 by 0.7–2 millimeters. The green, elliptical fruit are 9–16 by 7–17 millimeters. The fruit are wrinkly with ridges or bumps, and sparsely hairy. Each fruit has up to 2 spherical seeds that are 10 by 9–10 by 5–6 millimeters. The seeds are wrinkly.

=== Reproductive biology ===
The pollen of P. macgregorii is shed as permanent tetrads.

== Habitat and distribution ==
It has been observed growing in lowland forests at elevations of 100–130 meters (330–430 ft).
