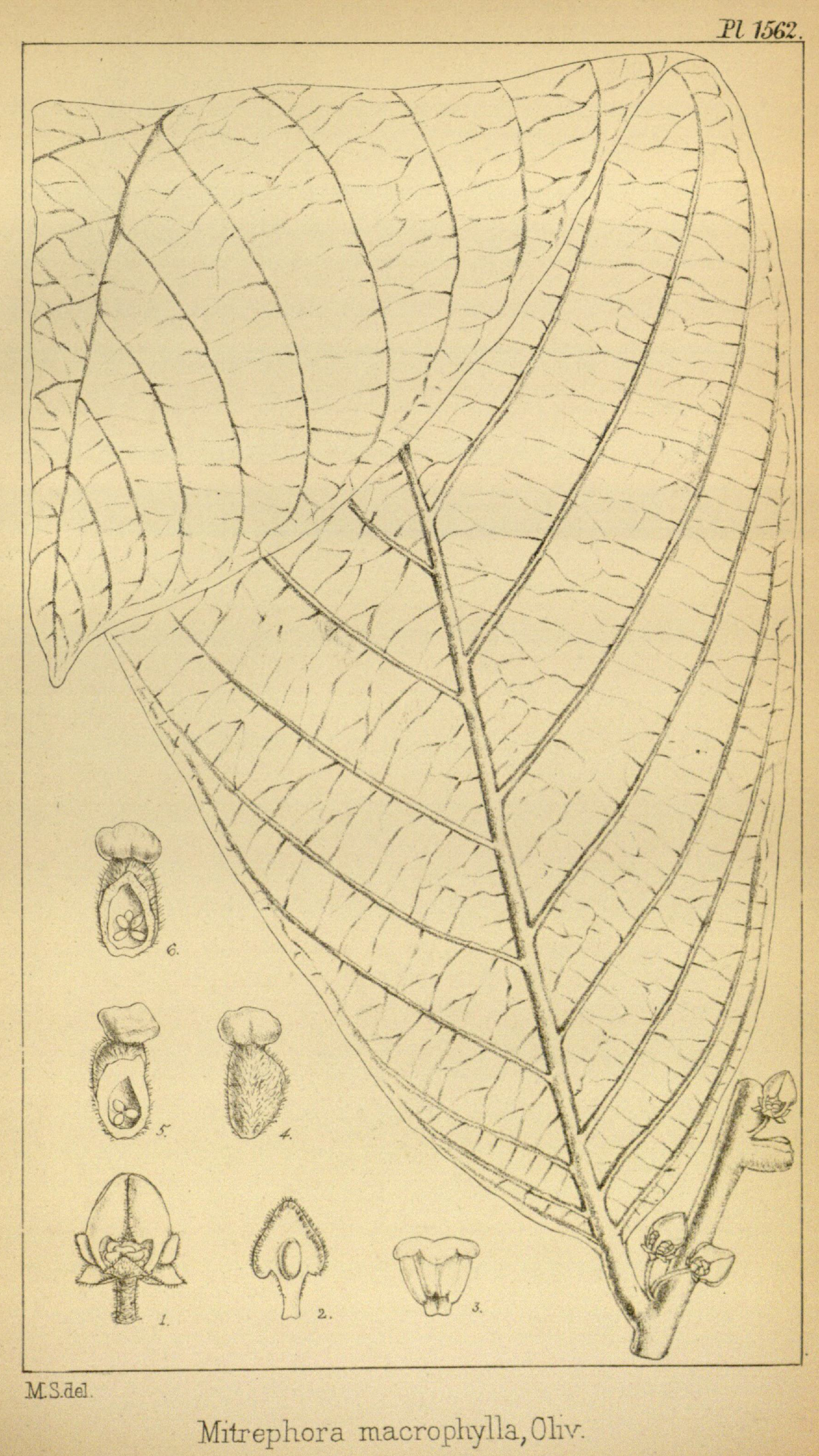
- Botanical illustration of Pseuduvaria macrophylla using the synonym Mitrephora macrophylla

Conservation status
- Least Concern (IUCN 3.1)

Scientific classification
- Kingdom: Plantae
- Clade: Embryophytes
- Clade: Tracheophytes
- Clade: Spermatophytes
- Clade: Angiosperms
- Clade: Magnoliids
- Order: Magnoliales
- Family: Annonaceae
- Genus: Pseuduvaria
- Species: P. macrophylla

Binomial name
- Pseuduvaria macrophylla (Oliv.) Merr.

Synonyms
- Mitrephora macrophylla Oliv. Pseuduvaria nervosa J.Sinclair

= Pseuduvaria macrophylla =

Species of plant in the soursop family

Pseuduvaria macrophylla is a species of plant in the family Annonaceae. It is native to Peninsular Malaysia, Sumatra and Thailand. Daniel Oliver, the English botanists who first formally described the species using the synonym Mitrephora macrophylla, named it after its large leaves (Latinized forms of Greek μακρος, makros and φυλλον, phullon).

== Description ==
It is a tree reaching 14 meters (46 ft) in height. The young, yellow-brown to dark brown branches are densely covered in hairs. Its elliptical to egg-shaped, papery to leathery leaves are 12–29.5 cm (4.7–11.6 in) by 4–11 cm (1.6–4.3 in). The leaves have pointed to wedge-shaped to blunt bases and tapering tips, with the tapering portion 5–22 millimeters long. The leaves are hairless on their upper and lower surfaces. The leaves have 12–22 pairs of secondary veins emanating from their midribs. Its densely hairy petioles are 2–12 by 1–3.5 millimeters with a broad groove on their upper side. Its Inflorescences occur alone or in pairs on branches, and are organized on indistinct peduncles. Each inflorescence has a 1–2 flowers. Each flower is on a very densely hairy pedicel that is 3–18 by 0.3–1.1 millimeters. The pedicels are organized on a rachis up to 5 millimeters long that have up to 3 bracts. The pedicels have a medial, slightly hairy bract that is 0.3–1 millimeters long. Its flowers are unisexual. Its flowers have 3 triangular sepals, that are 1–2.5 by 1–2.5 millimeters and partially fused at their base. The sepals are hairless on their upper surface, very densely hairy on their lower surface, and hairy at their margins. Its 6 petals are arranged in two rows of 3. The outer petals are dark red, pink-purple, or purple. The oval to elliptical, outer petals are 1.5–4 by 2–3.5 millimeters with hairless upper surfaces and sparsely to densely hairy lower surfaces. The inner petals are dark red or purple. The heart-shaped to triangular, inner petals have a 2–5 millimeter long claw at their base and a 4–11 by 2–7 millimeter blade. The inner petals have heart-shaped to flat bases and pointed tips. The inner petals are hairless on their upper surface, except near their tips, and densely hairy on their lower surfaces. The inner petals have an elliptical, smooth, prominently raised gland on their upper surface. Male flowers have up to 55–65 stamens that are 0.7–1.3 by 0.4–0.8 millimeters. Female flowers have 11–17 carpels that are 1.2–2.1 by 0.6–1 millimeters. Each carpel has 2–5 ovules arranged in two rows. The female flowers have 3–9 sterile stamens. The fruit occur in clusters of 3–15 on slightly hairy pedicles that are 10–30 by 1–2.5 millimeters. The dark brown, globe-shaped fruit are 7–17 by 5–15 millimeters. The fruit are smooth, and very densely hairy. Each fruit has 4–5 hemispherical to lens-shaped seeds that are 8–9 by 5–7.5 by 2.5–5 millimeters. The seeds are very wrinkly.

=== Reproductive biology ===
The pollen of P. macrophylla is shed as permanent tetrads.

== Habitat and distribution ==
It has been observed growing in well-drained sand-loam, sand-clay and red soils in lowland and submontane forests at elevations of 50–1,500 meters (160–4,920 ft).
