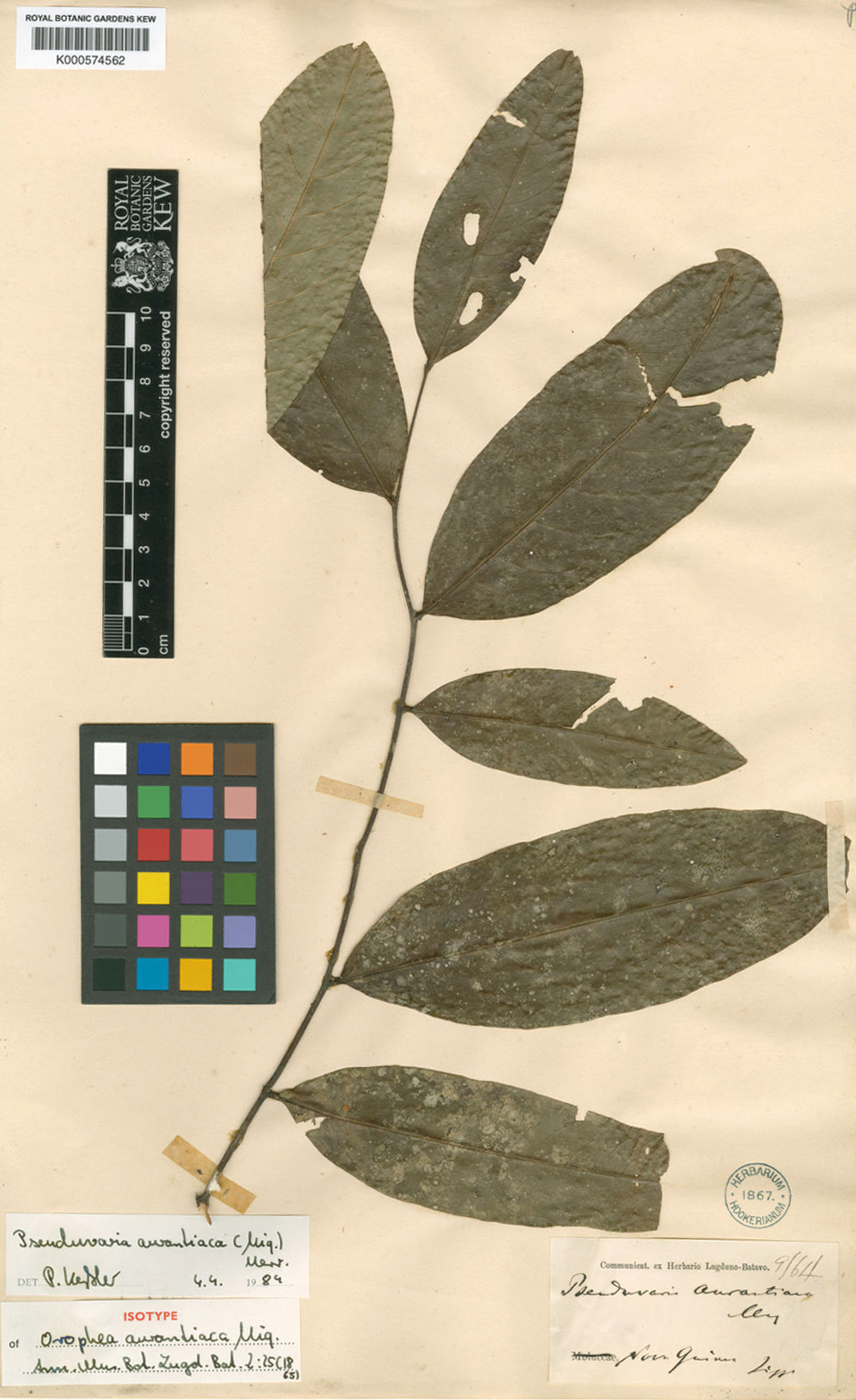
- Herbarium specimen of Pseuduvaria aurantiaca.

Scientific classification
- Kingdom: Plantae
- Clade: Tracheophytes
- Clade: Angiosperms
- Clade: Magnoliids
- Order: Magnoliales
- Family: Annonaceae
- Genus: Pseuduvaria
- Species: P. aurantiaca

Binomial name
- Pseuduvaria aurantiaca (Miq.) Merr.

Synonyms
- Orophea aurantiaca Miq.

= Pseuduvaria aurantiaca =

Species of plant in the soursop family

Pseuduvaria aurantiaca is a species of plant in the family Annonaceae. It is endemic to New Guinea. Friedrich Anton Wilhelm Miquel, the Dutch botanist who first formally described the species using the basionym Orophea aurantiaca, named it after its orange colored (aurantiacus, in Latin) fruit.

== Description ==
It is a tree that reaches 5 meters (16 ft) in height. Its branches have lenticels. Its leathery leaves are 14–19.5 by 5.5–7.5 centimeters and have pointed tips. The leaves are hairless when mature. The leaves have 12–18 pairs of secondary veins emanating from the central rib. Its petioles are 1.5–5 millimeters long with a groove on their upper side. Inflorescences are organized on slightly hairy peduncles 20–35 millimeters long. Each inflorescence consists of up to 10 flowers. Each flower is on a densely hairy pedicel 2–4 millimeters in length. The flowers are unisexual. Its flowers have 3 oval-shaped sepals, 0.8 by 1 millimeters, that have blunt tips. The outer surface of the sepals is densely hairy while the inside is smooth, and their margins have very fine hairs. Its 6 petals are arranged in two rows of 3. The outer petals are white or yellow-green and 2 by 2 millimeters. The outer petals are smooth on the inside and densely hairy on the outside. The inner petals have a 0.9 millimeter claw at their base and a 2–3.5 by 1.5–2 millimeter blade. The inner petals are smooth on their upper surface and densely hairy on their lower surface. Male flowers have up to 26 stamens that are 0.5–0.6 millimeters long. The gynoecium consists of 1–2 unfused carpels (monocarps). Fruit are attached to 30–40 millimeter peduncles by 8–9 millimeter pedicles. Mature monocarps are orange, hairy, wrinkly ellipsoids, 17–21 by 13–19 millimeters. Each monocarp has 6–8 wrinkly seeds, 8.5–13 by 6–8.5 millimeters.

=== Reproductive biology ===
The pollen of P. aurantiaca is shed as permanent tetrads.
