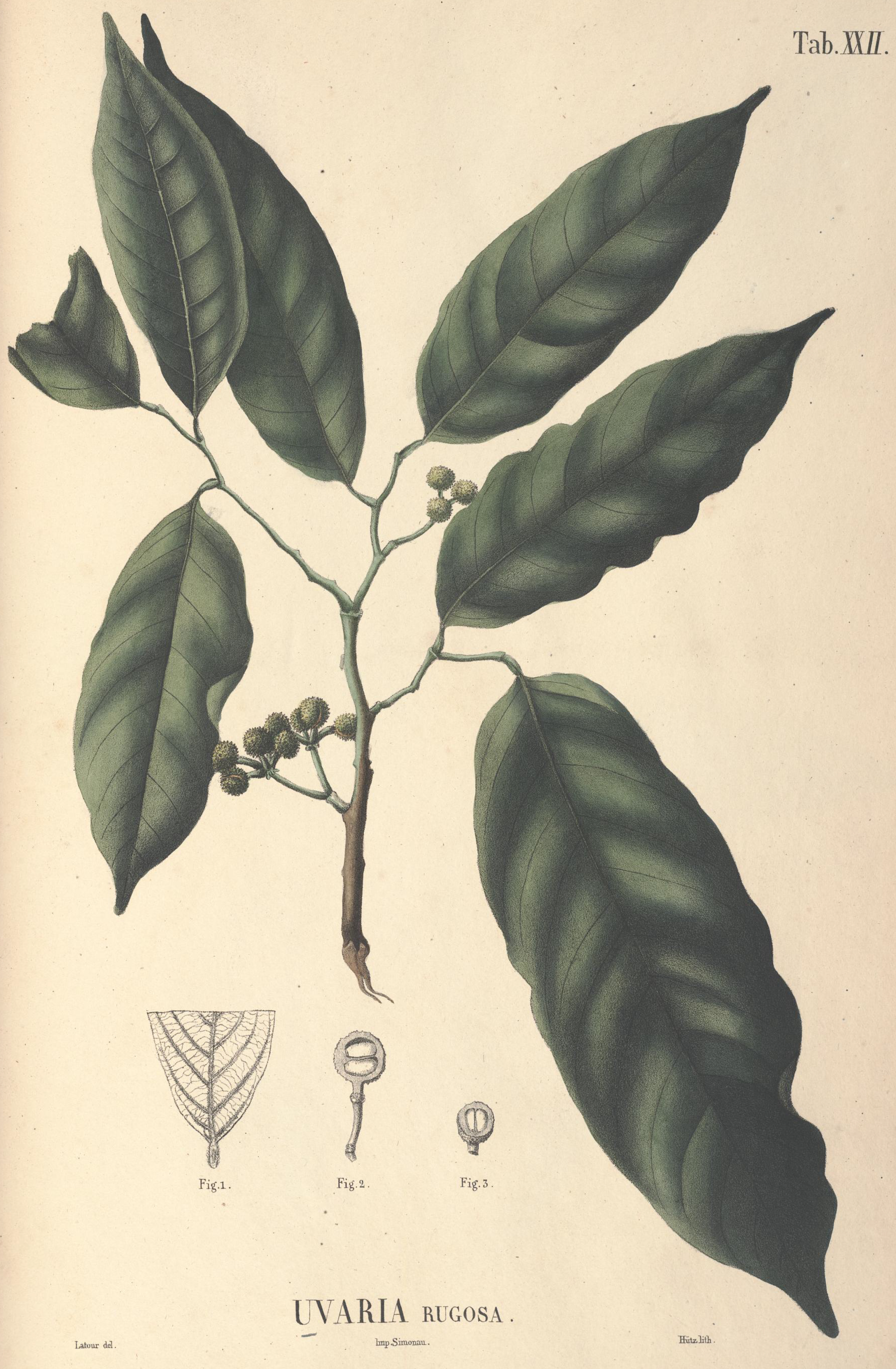
- Botanical illustration of Pseuduvaria rugosa using the synonym Uvaria rugosa

Conservation status
- Least Concern (IUCN 3.1)

Scientific classification
- Kingdom: Plantae
- Clade: Embryophytes
- Clade: Tracheophytes
- Clade: Spermatophytes
- Clade: Angiosperms
- Clade: Magnoliids
- Order: Magnoliales
- Family: Annonaceae
- Genus: Pseuduvaria
- Species: P. rugosa

Binomial name
- Pseuduvaria rugosa (Blume) Merr.

Synonyms
- Mitrephora micrantha Teijsm. & Binn. Mitrephora rugosa (Blume) Boerl. Orophea rugosa (Blume) Miq. Orophea trachycarpa Miq. Uva rugosa (Blume) Kuntze; Uvaria rugosa Blume

= Pseuduvaria rugosa =

Species of plant in the soursop family

Pseuduvaria rugosa is a species of plant in the family Annonaceae. It is native to Java, Laos, the Lesser Sunda Islands, Peninsular Malaysia, Myanmar, the Nicobar Islands, Sumatra and Thailand. Carl Ludwig Blume, the botanist who first formally described the species under the basionym Uvaria rugosa, named it after its wrinkled (rugosus in Latin) fruit.

== Description ==
It is a tree reaching 40 meters (130 ft) in height. The young, dark brown to black branches are densely hairy but become hairless as they mature. Its elliptical to egg-shaped, papery to slightly leathery leaves are 10–23 cm (3.9–9.1 in) by 3–8.5 cm (1.2–3.3 in). The leaves have pointed, wedge-shaped or blunt bases and tapering tips, with the tapering portion 6–15 millimeters long. The leaves are hairless on their upper and lower surfaces. The leaves have 10–18 pairs of secondary veins emanating from their midribs. Its sparsely to densely hairy petioles are 4–12 by 0.8–3 millimeters with a narrow groove on their upper side. Its Inflorescences occur in groups of 3–6 on branches, and are organized on very densely hairy peduncles that are 1.5–4 by 0.5–0.7 millimeters. Each inflorescence has 1–2 flowers. Each flower is on a very densely hairy pedicel that is 7–24 by 0.3–0.8 millimeters. The pedicels are organized on a rachis up to 5 millimeters long that have 3 bracts. The pedicels have a medial, very densely hairy bract that is 0.5–1.5 millimeters long. Its flowers are unisexual. Its flowers have 3 free, triangular sepals that are 0.9–1.5 by 0.8–1.5 millimeters. The sepals are hairless on their upper surface, very densely hairy on their lower surface, and hairy at their margins. Its 6 petals are arranged in two rows of 3. The light yellow-green, oval to elliptical, outer petals are 1–2.5 by 1–2.5 millimeters with hairless upper and very densely hairy lower surfaces. The inner petals are red-purple to red-brown on their upper surfaces and light-yellow-green on their lower surfaces. The diamond-shaped inner petals have a 3–7.5 millimeter long claw at their base and a 4–10 by 2–4 millimeter blade. The inner petals have pointed bases and tips. The inner petals are very densely hairy on their upper and lower surfaces. Male flowers have 30–58 stamens that are 0.5–0.8 by 0.4–0.7 millimeters. Female flowers have 5–13 carpels that are 1–1.5 by 0.5–0.8 millimeters. Each carpel has 2–6 ovules arranged in two rows. Female flowers can have 4–6 sterile stamens. The fruit occur in clusters of 1–9 and are organized on densely hairy peduncles that are 3–5 by 1–2 millimeters. The fruit are attached by sparsely hairy pedicles that are 12–27 by 0.8–3 millimeters. The yellow-green to brown, globe-shaped fruit are 10–20 by 10–20 millimeters. The fruit are winkled, and very densely hairy. Each fruit has 2–6 hemispherical to lens-shaped seeds that are 10–14 by 5–7.5 by 3.5–5 millimeters. The seeds are wrinkled.

=== Reproductive biology ===
The pollen of P. rugosa is shed as permanent tetrads.

== Habitat and distribution ==
It has been observed growing on granite and limestone substrates in evergreen forests, dry ridge forests, or freshwater swamp forests, at elevations of 100–450 meters (330–1,480 ft).

== Uses ==
Bioactive molecules extracted from its leaves and twigs have been reported to have cytostatic activity in tests with cultured human cancer cell lines.
