= Pseuduvaria taipingensis =

Conservation status
- Critically Endangered (IUCN 3.1)

Scientific classification
- Kingdom: Plantae
- Clade: Tracheophytes
- Clade: Angiosperms
- Clade: Magnoliids
- Order: Magnoliales
- Family: Annonaceae
- Genus: Pseuduvaria
- Species: P. taipingensis

Binomial name
- Pseuduvaria taipingensis J. Sinclair

Species of tree

Pseuduvaria taipingensis is a species of plant in the family Annonaceae. It is a tree endemic to Peninsular Malaysia. James Sinclair, the Scottish botanist who first formally described the species, named it after Taiping a city in Perak, Malaysia where the specimen he examined was collected.

== Description ==
It is a small tree. The young, yellow to brown branches are densely hairy, but become hairless with maturity. Its egg-shaped to elliptical, slightly leathery leaves are 16.5-30 by 6-11.5 centimeters. The leaves have heart-shaped to rounded bases and tapering tips, with the tapering portion 14-23 millimeters long. The leaves are hairless. The leaves have 14-18 pairs of secondary veins emanating from their midribs. Its densely hairy petioles are 5 by 1.5-4 millimeters with a broad groove on their upper side. Its solitary Inflorescences occur on branches, and are organized on very densely hairy peduncles that are 1.5 by 1 millimeters. Each inflorescence has up to 1-2 flowers. Each flower is on a very densely hairy pedicel that is 18-20 by 0.5 millimeters. The pedicels are organized on a rachis up to 5 millimeters long that have 2 bracts. The pedicels have a medial, very densely hairy bract that is up to 1 millimeter long. Its flowers are unisexual. Its flowers have 3 free, triangular sepals, that are 1.5 by 1.5 millimeters. The sepals are hairless on their upper surface, densely hairy on their lower surface, and hairy at their margins. Its 6 petals are arranged in two rows of 3. The yellow, egg-shaped, outer petals are 2.5 by 2.5 millimeters with hairless upper and very densely hairy lower surfaces. The yellow, heart-shaped inner petals have a 4.5 millimeter long claw at their base and a 7.5 by 4.5 millimeter blade. The inner petals have heart-shaped bases and pointed tips. The inner petals are sparsely hairy on their upper surfaces and densely hairy on lower surfaces. The inner surface of the inner petals has a solitary, smooth, slightly raised, irregularly shaped gland. The male flowers have up to 40 stamens that are 0.5-0.8 by 0.5-0.8 millimeters. The solitary fruit are organized on sparsely hairy peduncles that are 5 by 1 millimeters. The fruit are attached by sparseliy hairy pedicles that are 18-26 by 1-1.5 millimeters. The yellow to brown-purple, globe-shaped fruit are 15-20 by 14-18 millimeters. The fruit are smooth, and densely hairy. Each fruit has up to 2-4 hemispherical to lens-shaped, wrinkly seeds that are 10 by 10 by 5 millimeters. Each seed has a 0.5-0.8 by 0.3-0.5 millimeter elliptical hilum. The seeds are arranged in two rows in the fruit.

=== Reproductive biology ===
The pollen of P. taipingensis is shed as permanent tetrads.

== Habitat and distribution ==
It has been observed growing in dense forests below mountains at elevations up to 1400 meters.
