= Pseuduvaria trimera =

Conservation status
- Least Concern (IUCN 3.1)

Scientific classification
- Kingdom: Plantae
- Clade: Embryophytes
- Clade: Tracheophytes
- Clade: Spermatophytes
- Clade: Angiosperms
- Clade: Magnoliids
- Order: Magnoliales
- Family: Annonaceae
- Genus: Pseuduvaria
- Species: P. trimera

Binomial name
- Pseuduvaria trimera (Craib) Y.C.F.Su & R.M.K.Saunders

Synonyms
- Mitrephora trimera Craib; Pseuduvaria indochinensis Merr.

Species of plant in the soursop family

Pseuduvaria trimera is a species of plant in the family Annonaceae. It is native to Myanmar, Thailand, Vietnam, and Yunnan. William Grant Craib, the British botanist who first formally described the species, named it after its fascicles of flowers that often occur in three (Latinized form of Greek τρι-, tri-) parts (Latinized form of Greek -μέρος, -meros).

== Description ==
It is a tree reaching 20 meters (66 ft) in height. The young, brown branches are densely hairy, but become hairless with maturity. Its egg-shaped to elliptical, slightly leathery leaves are 15–25 cm (5.9–9.8 in) by 4–8.5 cm (1.6–3.3 in). The leaves have blunt to wedge-shaped bases and tapering tips, with the tapering portion 4–17 millimeters long. The leaves are sparsely hairy on their upper surface and hairless on their lower surface. The leaves have 14–18 pairs of secondary veins emanating from their midribs. Its very densely hairy petioles are 4–11 by 1.5–2.5 millimeters with a broad groove on their upper side. Its Inflorescences occur in groups of 3–6 on branches, and are organized on indistinct peduncles. Each inflorescence has up to 1–2 flowers. Each flower is on a very densely hairy pedicel that is 10–30 by 0.5–1.5 millimeters. The pedicels are organized on a rachis up to 5 millimeters long that have 2–3 bracts. The pedicels have a medial, very densely hairy bract that is up to 0.5–1.2 millimeter long. Its flowers are unisexual. Its flowers have 3 free, oval sepals, that are 1–1.5 by 2–2.5 millimeters. The sepals are hairless on their upper surface, densely hairy on their lower surface, and hairy at their margins. Its 6 petals are arranged in two rows of 3. The yellow to light green, oval, outer petals are 2–3 by 1.5–3 millimeters with hairless upper and very densely hairy lower surfaces. The yellow to light green, triangular inner petals have a 2.5–5 millimeter long claw at their base and a 5–8 by 3–3.5 millimeter blade. The inner petals have flat bases and pointed tips. The inner petals are sparsely hairy on their upper surfaces and densely hairy on lower surfaces. The male flowers have 46–56 stamens that are 0.6–0.8 by 0.5–0.8 millimeters. Female flowers have 7–14 carpels that are 1.5–2 by 0.7–1 millimeters. Each carpel has up to 5–6 ovules arranged in two rows. The female flowers have 7–9 sterile stamen. The fruit occur in clusters of 7–8 are organized on indistinct peduncles. The fruit are attached by sparsely nearly hairless pedicles that are 20–30 by 2.5–3.5 millimeters. The green, globe-shaped fruit are 16–22 by 16–21 millimeters. The fruit are wrinkly, and densely hairy. Each fruit has up to 6 hemispherical to lens-shaped, wrinkly seeds that are 12.5–17 by 7.5–9.5 by 4.5–7 millimeters. Each seed has a 0.5–2 by 0.5–1.2 millimeter circular to elliptical hilum. The seeds are arranged in two rows in the fruit.

=== Reproductive biology ===
The pollen of P. trimera is shed as permanent tetrads.

== Habitat and distribution ==
It has been observed growing in evergreen and deciduous forests below limestone mountains at elevations of 240–1,500 meters (790–4,920 ft).

== Uses ==
Extracts of bioactive molecules from its tissues have been reported to contain aporphine derivatives with cytoxic activity in tests with culture human cancer cells.
