= Pseuduvaria parvipetala =

Conservation status
- Vulnerable (IUCN 3.1)

Scientific classification
- Kingdom: Plantae
- Clade: Embryophytes
- Clade: Tracheophytes
- Clade: Spermatophytes
- Clade: Angiosperms
- Clade: Magnoliids
- Order: Magnoliales
- Family: Annonaceae
- Genus: Pseuduvaria
- Species: P. parvipetala

Binomial name
- Pseuduvaria parvipetala Y.C.F.Su & R.M.K.Saunders

Species of plant in the soursop family

Pseuduvaria parvipetala is a species of plant in the family Annonaceae. It is native to Borneo and Sumatra. Yvonne Su and Richard Saunders, the botanists who first formally described the species, named it after its small (parvi-, in Latin) petals (petala, in Latin).

== Description ==
It is a tree reaching 10 meters (33 ft) in height. The young, light to dark brown branches are sparsely hairy and also have sparse lenticels. Its egg-shaped to elliptical, papery to slightly leathery leaves are 8.5–17 cm (3.3–6.7 in) by 3–6.5 cm (1.2–2.6 in) centimeters. The leaves have pointed bases and tapering tips, with the tapering portion 12–22 millimeters long. The leaves are hairless on their upper and lower surfaces. The leaves have 10–14 pairs of secondary veins emanating from their midribs. Its sparsely to densely hairy petioles are 4–10 by 1–2 millimeters with a broad groove on their upper side. Its Inflorescences occur in pairs on branches, and are organized on slightly to sparsely hairy peduncles that are 1.5–3 millimeters. Each inflorescence has up to 18 flowers. Each flower is on a slightly to sparsely hairy pedicel that is 3–9 by 0.2–0.5 millimeters. The pedicels are organized on a rachis up to 5 millimeters long that have 3–18 bracts. The pedicels have a medial, densely hairy bract that is 0.5–1 millimeters long. Its flowers are unisexual. Its flowers have 3 free, triangular sepals, that are 0.7–1 by 1–1.5 millimeters. The sepals are hairless on their upper surface, sparsely to densely hairy on their lower surface, and hairy at their margins. Its 6 petals are arranged in two rows of 3. The pale yellow to pink, oval, outer petals are 1.5–2 by 1–2 millimeters with hairless upper and sparsely hairy lower surfaces. The pale yellow to pink, triangular, inner petals have a 1–2 millimeter long claw at their base and a 2–3.5 by 1.5–2.5 millimeter blade. The inner petals have flat bases and pointed tips. The inner petals are slightly hairy on their upper and lower surfaces. The inner petals have a single, smooth, flat, sausage-shaped gland on their upper surface. Male flowers have up to 26 stamens that are 0.6 by 0.5–0.6 millimeters. Female flowers have up to 5 carpels that are 1 by 0.5 millimeters. Each carpel has 2 ovules. The fruit occur in pairs and are organized on a sparsely hairy peduncle that is 3 by 1 millimeters. The fruit are attached by sparsely hairy pedicles that are 15 by 1 millimeters. The globe-shaped fruit are 7–9 by 7–9 millimeters. The fruit are wrinkly, and densely hairy.

=== Reproductive biology ===
The pollen of P. parvipetala is shed as permanent tetrads.

== Habitat and distribution ==
It has been observed growing in sandstone or clay soils in lowland forests or rocky outcrops at elevations of 100–230 meters (330–750 ft).
