= Pseuduvaria cerina =

Conservation status
- Data Deficient (IUCN 3.1)

Scientific classification
- Kingdom: Plantae
- Clade: Embryophytes
- Clade: Tracheophytes
- Clade: Spermatophytes
- Clade: Angiosperms
- Clade: Magnoliids
- Order: Magnoliales
- Family: Annonaceae
- Genus: Pseuduvaria
- Species: P. cerina

Binomial name
- Pseuduvaria cerina J.Sinclair

Species of tree

Pseuduvaria cerina is a species of tree in the Annonaceae family. It is endemic to Peninsular Malaysia. James Sinclair, the Scottish botanist who first formally described the species, named it after its waxy yellow (cerinus in Latin) inner petals.

== Description ==
P. cerina can reach 5 meters in height. Its branches have faint lenticels. Its mildly leathery leaves are 10.5-15.5 by 3.5-6 centimeters and come to a point at their tips. The leaves are hairless on their upper and lower surfaces and except for the lower surface of the midrib which is sparsely hairy. The leaves have 6-8 pairs of secondary veins emanating from their midribs. Its hairless petioles are 6-10 millimeters long with a groove on their upper side. Inflorescences are organized on indistinct peduncles. Each inflorescence has a single flower. Each flower is on a densely hairy pedicel 11-26 millimeters in length. The flowers are unisexual. Its flowers have 3 oval sepals, 1-1.5 by 1-1.5 millimeters. The sepals are smooth on their upper surface, hairy on their lower surface, and have fine hairs on their margins. Its 6 petals are arranged in two rows of 3. The oval outer petals are 1.5-2 by 1-2 millimeters with smooth upper surfaces and densely hairy lower surfaces. The outer petals are green. The inner petals have a 1-2 millimeter long claw at their base and a 3-4.5 by 2-3 millimeter blade. The waxy yellow colored inner petals are smooth on their upper and lower surfaces. Each inner petal has an ovoid gland at the base of its outer surface. Male flowers have up to 39 stamens that are 0.6-0.7 millimeters long. Female flowers have up to 7 carpels per flower and 3 ovules per carpel.

=== Reproductive biology ===
The pollen of P. cerina is shed as permanent tetrads.
