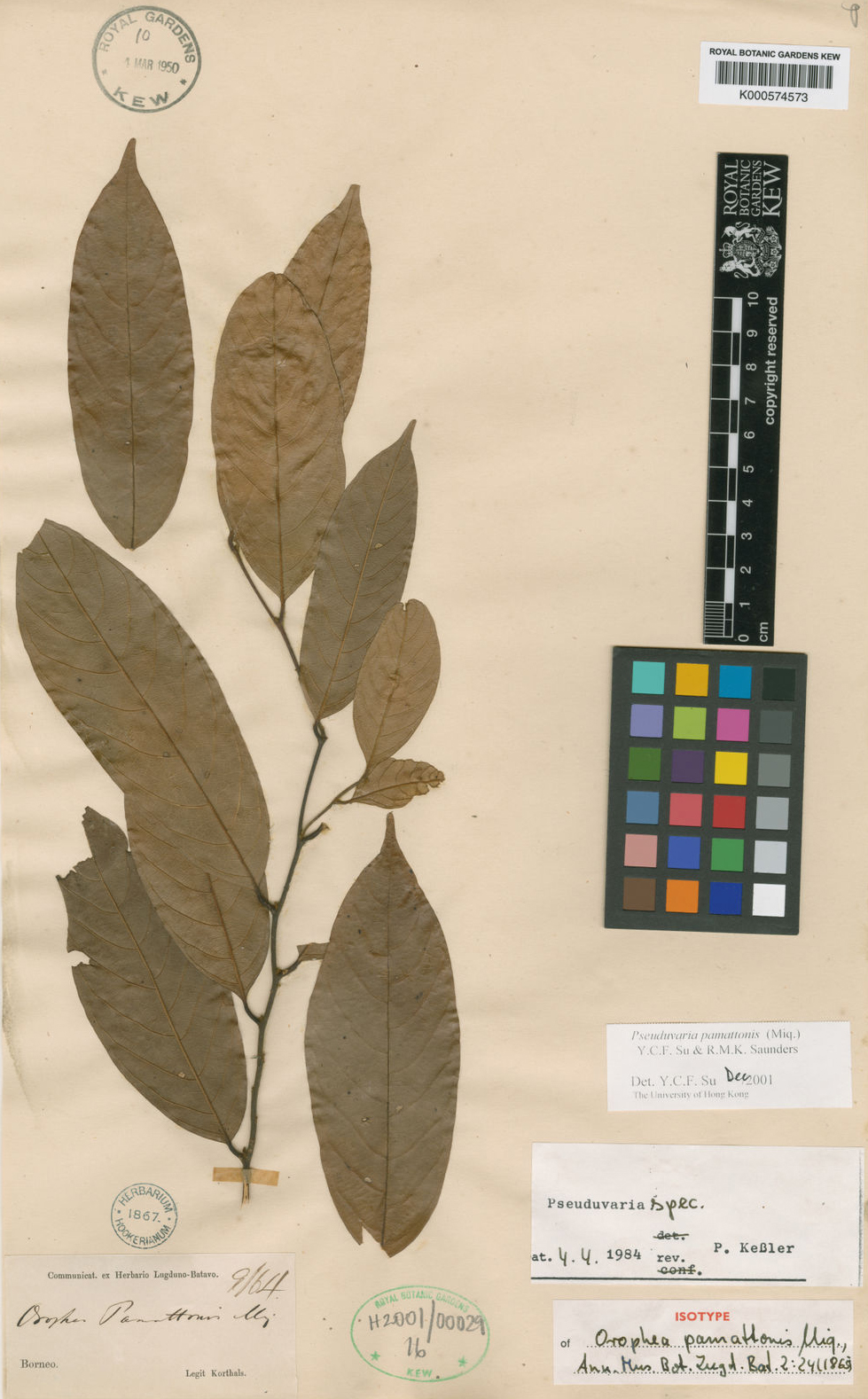
- Herbarium specimen of Pseuduvaria pamattonis

Conservation status
- Least Concern (IUCN 3.1)

Scientific classification
- Kingdom: Plantae
- Clade: Embryophytes
- Clade: Tracheophytes
- Clade: Spermatophytes
- Clade: Angiosperms
- Clade: Magnoliids
- Order: Magnoliales
- Family: Annonaceae
- Genus: Pseuduvaria
- Species: P. pamattonis

Binomial name
- Pseuduvaria pamattonis (Miq.) Y.C.F.Su & R.M.K.Saunders

Synonyms
- Hydnocarpus unonifolius Elmer Orophea pamattonis Miq

= Pseuduvaria pamattonis =

Species of plant in the soursop family

Pseuduvaria pamattonis is a species of plant in the family Annonaceae. It is native to Borneo and the Philippines. Friedrich Miquel, the Dutch botanist who first formally described the species using the basionym Orophea pamattonis, named it after a mountain in Borneo called Gunung Pamaton.

== Description ==
It is a tree reaching 22 meters (72 ft) in height. The young, yellow to gray-brown branches are slightly to densely hairy and also have sparse lenticels. Its egg-shaped to elliptical, slightly leathery to leathery leaves are 9–20 cm (3.5–7.9 in) by 3–7.5 cm (1.2–3.0 in) centimeters. The leaves have pointed to blunt bases and tapering tips, with the tapering portion 8–24 millimeters long. The leaves are hairless on their upper and lower surfaces. The leaves have 10–16 pairs of secondary veins emanating from their midribs. Its sparsely to very densely hairy petioles are 4–13 by 1–2.5 millimeters with a broad groove on their upper side. Its Inflorescences occur in groups of 2–7 on branches, and are organized on indistinct peduncles. Each inflorescence has 1–2 flowers. Each flower is on a densely hairy pedicel that is 4–11 by 0.3–0.7 millimeters. The pedicels are organized on a rachis up to 5 millimeters long that have 2 bracts. The pedicels have a medial, sparsely hairy bract that is 0.2–1 millimeters long. Its flowers are unisexual. Its flowers have 3 free, oval sepals, that are 0.5–1.5 by 0.7–2 millimeters. The sepals are hairless on their upper surface, sparsely to densely hairy on their lower surface, and hairy at their margins. Its 6 petals are arranged in two rows of 3. The white to yellow, oval, outer petals are 1–2 by 1–2 millimeters with hairless upper and densely hairy lower surfaces. The white to yellow, heart-shaped to diamond-shaped, inner petals have a 2–7 millimeter long claw at their base and a 4–10 by 2–5 millimeter blade. The tips of the male flowers have two concave sides while those of the female flowers are pointed. The bases of the male flowers are heart-shaped to flat while those of the female flowers are flat. The inner petals are densely hairy on their upper and lower surfaces. Male flowers have 30–45 stamens that are 0.5–0.8 by 0.4–0.6 millimeters. Female flowers have 6–7 carpels that are 1.4–1.6 by 0.6–0.9 millimeters. Each carpel has 3–5 ovules arranged in two rows. The female flowers have up to 6 sterile stamens. The fruit occur in clusters of 1–5 on sparsely to densely hairy pedicles that are 9–13 by 1–2.5 millimeters. The brown, globe-shaped fruit are 12–21 by 11–18 millimeters. The fruit are smooth, and very densely hairy. Each fruit has 3–5 hemispherical to lens-shaped seeds that are 9–11.5 by 6.5–9 by 2- millimeters. The seeds are wrinkly.

=== Reproductive biology ===
The pollen of P. pamattonis is shed as permanent tetrads.

== Habitat and distribution ==
It has been observed growing in limestone and clay soils in lowland and mountain forests at elevations of 70–670 meters (230–2,200 ft).
