= Pseuduvaria oxycarpa =

Scientific classification
- Kingdom: Plantae
- Clade: Tracheophytes
- Clade: Angiosperms
- Clade: Magnoliids
- Order: Magnoliales
- Family: Annonaceae
- Genus: Pseuduvaria
- Species: P. oxycarpa

Binomial name
- Pseuduvaria oxycarpa (Boerl. ex Koord.-Schum.) Y.C.F.Su & R.M.K.Saunders

Synonyms
- Mitrephora oxycarpa Boerl. ex Koord.-Schum.

Species of plant in the soursop family

Pseuduvaria oxycarpa is a species of plant in the family Annonaceae. It is native to Sulawesi. Anna Koorders-Schumacher, the Dutch botanist who first formally described the species, named it after the pointed (Latinized form of Greek oξυς, oxus) tips of its fruit (Latinized form of Greek καρπoς, karpos).

== Description ==
It is a tree reaching 13 meters (43 ft) in height. The young, yellow-brown to dark brown branches are slightly hairy. Its elliptical, papery leaves are 18–43.5 cm (7.1–17.1 in) by 7.5–15 cm (3.0–5.9 in). The leaves have blunt bases and tapering tips, with the tapering portion 12–17 millimeters long. The leaves are hairless on their upper and lower surfaces. The leaves have 16–20 pairs of secondary veins emanating from their midribs. Its slightly hairy petioles are 9–15 by 2.5–4.5 millimeters with a broad groove on their upper side. Its inflorescences occur in groups of 2–5 on branches, and are organized on indistinct peduncles. Each inflorescence has 1–2 flowers. Each flower is on a very densely hairy pedicel that is 14–20 by 0.6–1 millimeters. The pedicels are organized on a rachis up to 5 millimeters long that have up to 6 bracts. The pedicels have a medial, very densely hairy bract that is 1.5–2 millimeters long. Its flowers are unisexual. Its flowers have 3 free, oval sepals, that are 1.5–2 by 2–3 millimeters. The sepals are hairless on their upper surface, densely hairy on their lower surface, and hairy at their margins. Its 6 petals are arranged in two rows of 3. The yellow, circular, outer petals are 5 by 4.5–5 millimeters with hairless upper and very densely hairy lower surfaces. The yellow, diamond-shaped inner petals have a 2–2.5 millimeter long claw at their base and a 5–6 by 3–4 millimeter blade. The inner petals have pointed bases and tips. The inner petals are densely hairy upper surfaces and very densely hairy lower surfaces. Male flowers have up to 65 stamens that are 0.7 by 0.5–0.6 millimeters. Female flowers have 6–9 carpels that are 2 by 1 millimeters. Each carpel has 3–4 ovules arranged in two rows. The fruit occur in clusters of 5–9 on slightly hairy pedicles that are 14–22 by 1.5–3.5 millimeters. The green, mature fruit are 13–22 by 7–18 millimeters. The fruit are globe shaped with an extended point. The fruit are wrinkly, and densely hairy. Each fruit has 3–4 lens-shaped seeds that are 11–13 by 7–8.5 by 5–6.5 millimeters. The seeds are wrinkly.

=== Reproductive biology ===
The pollen of P. oxycarpa is shed as permanent tetrads.

== Habitat and distribution ==
It has been observed growing in clay volcanic soils in primary forests at elevations of 200–750 meters (660–2,460 ft).
