= Pseuduvaria grandifolia =

Scientific classification
- Kingdom: Plantae
- Clade: Tracheophytes
- Clade: Angiosperms
- Clade: Magnoliids
- Order: Magnoliales
- Family: Annonaceae
- Genus: Pseuduvaria
- Species: P. grandifolia

Binomial name
- Pseuduvaria grandifolia (Warb.) J.Sinclair

Synonyms
- Mitrephora grandifolia (Warb.) Diels; Stelechocarpus grandifolius (Warb.)

Species of plant in the soursop family

Pseuduvaria grandifolia is a species of plant in the family Annonaceae. It is native to New Guinea. Otto Warburg, the German-Jewish botanists who first formally described the species using the basionym Stelechocarpus grandifolius, named it after its large (grandi-, in Latin) leaves (folia, in Latin).

== Description ==
It is a tree reaching 12 meters (39 ft) in height. The young, dark brown to black branches are sparsely covered in hairs and also have sparse lenticels. Its large, egg-shaped to elliptical, papery to leathery leaves are 18.5–32 by 6–13.5 centimeters. The leaves have pointed to wedge-shaped bases and abruptly tapering tips, with the tapering portion 2–10 millimeters long. The leaves are slightly hairy on their upper and lower surfaces except the midrib which is densely hairy on the underside. The leaves have 16–24 pairs of secondary veins emanating from their midribs. Its sparsely to densely hairy petioles are 6–12 by 2–3.5 millimeters with a broad groove on their upper side. Its Inflorescences occur in groups of up to 10 on the trunk, and are organized on indistinct peduncles. Each inflorescence has up to 10 flowers. Each flower is on a densely hairy pedicel that is 15–35 by 0.6–0.9 millimeters. The pedicels are organized on a rachis up to 5 millimeters long that have 6–10 bracts. The pedicels have a medial, densely hairy bract that is 1-1.5 millimeters long. Its flowers are male or hermaphroditic Its flowers have 3 oval sepals, that are 2–3.5 by 3–4 millimeters. The sepals are hairless on their upper surface, densely hairy on their lower surface, and hairy at their margins. Its 6 petals are arranged in two rows of 3. The white or maroon, oval to egg-shaped, outer petals are 3.5–7 by 4.5–6 millimeters with hairless upper surfaces and very densely hairy lower surfaces. The white or maroon, diamond-shaped, inner petals have a 1.7–2.5 millimeter long claw at their base and a 6–9 by 6–7.5 millimeter blade. The inner petals have pointed bases and tips. The inner petals are slightly hairy on their upper surface and very densely hairy on their lower surfaces. The inner petals have numerous, irregularly shaped, raised glands on their upper surface. Male flowers have 48–61 stamens that are 0.9–1 by 0.6–1 millimeters. Hermaphroditic flowers have 37–45 stamens that are 0.9–1 by 0.6–1 millimeters. Hermaphroditic flowers have 11–16 carpels that are 2-2.5 by 0.7–1 millimeters. Each carpel has 6–11 ovules arranged in two rows. The fruit occur in clusters of 3–8 on densely hairy pedicles that are 18 by 2.5 millimeters. The orange, mature fruit are globe-shaped and 36–38 by 29–32 millimeters. The fruit are smooth, and densely hairy. Each fruit has 6–11 hemispherical to lens-shaped seeds that are 10–19 by 8–11 by 2.5–4.5 millimeters. The seeds are wrinkly.

=== Reproductive biology ===
The pollen of P. grandifolia is shed as permanent tetrads.

== Habitat and distribution ==
It has been observed growing in rainforests at elevations of 20–1,400 meters (66–4,600 ft).
