= Pseuduvaria beccarii =

Scientific classification
- Kingdom: Plantae
- Clade: Tracheophytes
- Clade: Angiosperms
- Clade: Magnoliids
- Order: Magnoliales
- Family: Annonaceae
- Genus: Pseuduvaria
- Species: P. beccarii

Binomial name
- Pseuduvaria beccarii (Scheff.) J.Sinclair

Synonyms
- Orophea beccarii Scheff.

Species of plant in the soursop family

Pseuduvaria beccarii is a species of plant in the family Annonaceae. It is endemic to New Guinea. Rudolph Scheffer, the Dutch botanist who first formally described the species using the basionym Orophea beccarii, named it after Odoardo Beccari, the Italian naturalist who collected the sample he examined.

== Description ==
It is a tree reaching 18 meters (59 ft) in height. Its papery leaves are 16–23 by 6–8 centimeters and come to a point at their tips. The leaves are hairless on their upper surface and densely hairy on their lower surfaces. The leaves have 14–18 pairs of secondary veins emanating from their midribs. Its densely hairy petioles are up to 4 millimeters long with a groove on their upper side. Inflorescences are organized on densely hairy peduncles 8–20 millimeters long. Each inflorescence consists of up to 5 flowers. Each flower is on a densely hairy pedicel 4–12 millimeters in length. The flowers have both male and female reproductive structures. Its flowers have 3 small sepals, 1 by 0.5 millimeters. The sepals are smooth on their upper surface and densely hairy on their lower surface. Its 6 petals are arranged in two rows of 3. The outer petals are 2 by 1.5 millimeters with smooth upper surfaces and densely hairy lower surfaces. The inner petals have a 2–2.5 millimeter long claw at their base and a 4.5–6.5 by 3.5–4 millimeter blade. The inner petals are smooth on their upper surface and densely hairy on their lower surface. Its flowers have up to 20 stamens that are 0.6–0.7 millimeters long. Each flower has one carpel. Fruit are on 12–20 millimeter long peduncles. Fruit are 22–36 by 9–17 millimeter ellipsoids. The fruit are wrinkly, densely hairy and orange when mature. There are 8 seeds, 9.5–10.5 by 7–8 millimeters in each fruit.

=== Reproductive biology ===
The pollen of P. beccarii is shed as permanent tetrads.
