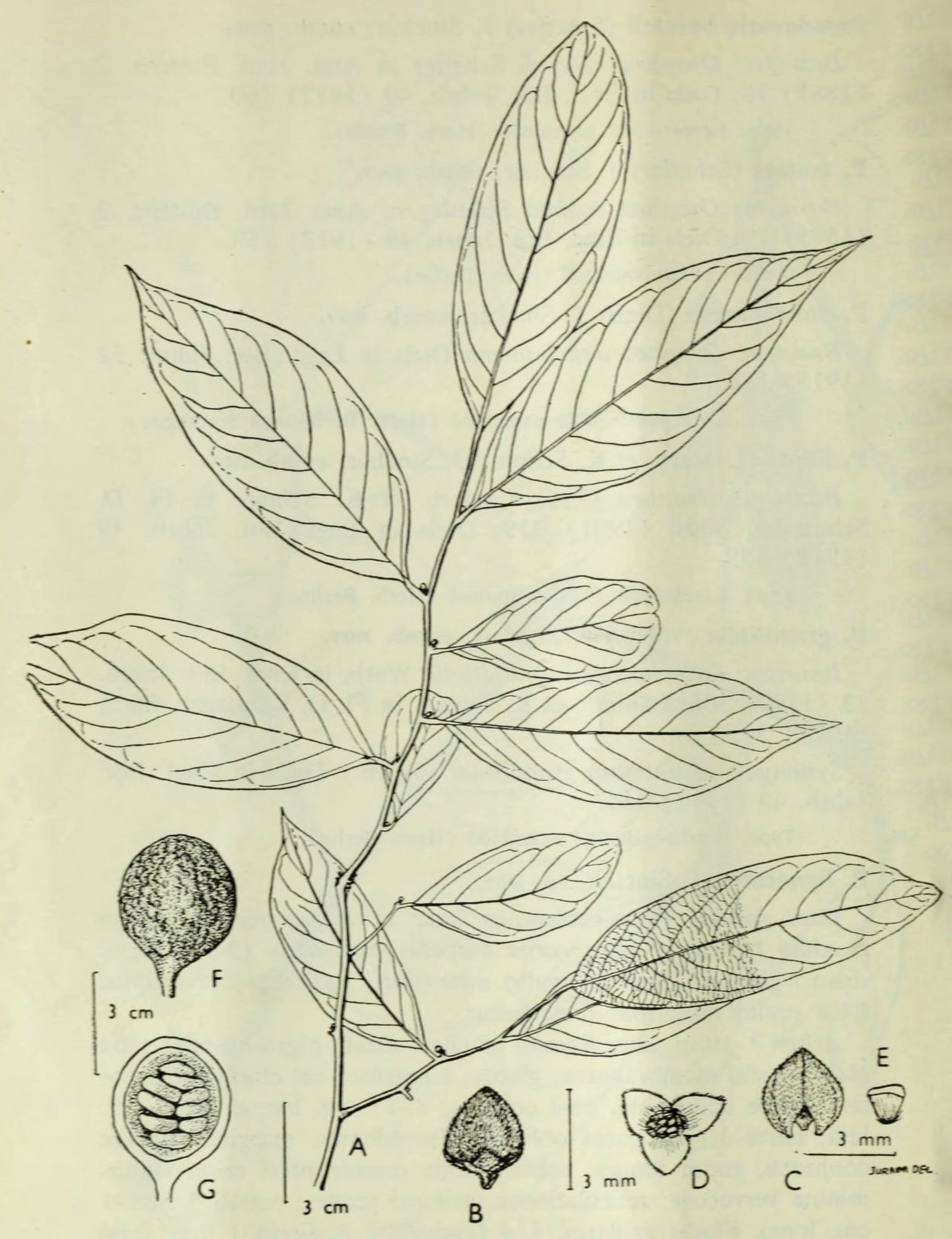
- Botanical illustration of Pseuduvaria lignocarpa.

Scientific classification
- Kingdom: Plantae
- Clade: Tracheophytes
- Clade: Angiosperms
- Clade: Magnoliids
- Order: Magnoliales
- Family: Annonaceae
- Genus: Pseuduvaria
- Species: P. lignocarpa

Binomial name
- Pseuduvaria lignocarpa J.Sinclair

= Pseuduvaria lignocarpa =

Species of plant in the soursop family

Pseuduvaria lignocarpa is a species of plant in the family Annonaceae. It is native to New Guinea. James Sinclair, the Scottish botanist who first formally described the species, named it after the woody (lignosus in Latin) wall of its fruit (Latinized form of Greek καρπoς, karpos).

== Description ==
It is a tree reaching 9 meters (30 ft) in height. The young, dark brown to black branches are sparsely hairy. Its elliptical to egg-shaped, leathery leaves are 11.5–19 by 3.5–6 centimeters. The leaves have pointed bases and tapering tips, with the tapering portion 10–20 millimeters long. The leaves are hairless on their upper and lower surfaces. The leaves have 10–16 pairs of secondary veins emanating from their midribs. Its sparsely hairy petioles are 6–11 by 1–2.5 millimeters with a narrow groove on their upper side. Its inflorescences occur alone or in pairs on branches, and are organized on indistinct peduncles. Each inflorescence has up to 2 flowers. Each flower is on a densely hairy pedicel that is 2–3 by 0.3–1 millimeters. The pedicels are organized on a rachis up to 5 millimeters long that have 2 bracts. The pedicels have a medial, very densely hairy bract that is 0.5 millimeters long. Its flowers are unisexual. Its flowers have 3 free, oval sepals, that are 0.7–1 by 0.7–1 millimeters. The sepals are hairless on their upper surface, very densely hairy on their lower surface, and hairy at their margins. Its 6 petals are arranged in two rows of 3. The dull brown to olive-colored, oval, outer petals are 1.5–2 by 1.5–2 millimeters. The outer petals have hairless upper surfaces and densely hairy lower surfaces. The dark crimson to brown, diamond-shaped, inner petals have a 0.5–0.8 millimeter long claw at their base and a 2.5–3.5 by 2–2.5 millimeter blade. The inner petals have pointed bases and tips. The inner petals are hairless on their upper surfaces and densely hairy on their lower surfaces. Male flowers have 19–21 stamens that are 0.5–0.7 by 0.5–0.7 millimeters. The olive-colored fruit are attached by slightly hairy pedicles that are 8 by 2.5 millimeters. The fruit are elliptical and 47 by 40–46 millimeters. The fruit are smooth, and very densely hairy. Each fruit has up to 11 seeds in two rows. The lens-shaped, wrinkly seeds are 16–23.5 by 9.5–13 by 3.5–6 millimeters.

=== Reproductive biology ===
The pollen of P. lignocarpa is shed as permanent tetrads.

== Habitat and distribution ==
It has been observed growing in lowland and submontane forests at elevations of 150–1,370 meters (490–4,490 ft).
