= Pseuduvaria latifolia =

- Botanical illustration of Pseuduvaria latifolia using the synonym Bocagea latifolia

Scientific classification
- Kingdom: Plantae
- Clade: Tracheophytes
- Clade: Angiosperms
- Clade: Magnoliids
- Order: Magnoliales
- Family: Annonaceae
- Genus: Pseuduvaria
- Species: P. latifolia

Binomial name
- Pseuduvaria latifolia (Blume) Bakh.f.

Synonyms
- Bocagea latifolia Blume; Mitrephora glandulifera Boerl. Pseuduvaria glandulifera (Boerl.) Merr. Uva hasseltii (Blume) Kuntze; Uvaria hasseltii Blume

Species of plant in the soursop family

Pseuduvaria latifolia is a species of plant in the family Annonaceae. It is native to Java. Carl Ludwig Blume, the German botanists who first formally described the species using the synonym Bocagea latifolia, named it after its broad (latus in Latin) leaves (folium in Latin).

== Description ==
It is a tree reaching 10 meters (33 ft) in height. The young, dark brown to black branches are sparsely covered in lenticels. Its elliptical to oval, papery to slightly leathery leaves are 9.5–19 by 4–7 centimeters. The leaves have slightly heart-shaped bases and tapering tips, with the tapering portion 3–20 millimeters long. The leaves are hairless on their upper and lower surfaces. The leaves have 10–14 pairs of secondary veins emanating from their midribs. Its hairless petioles are 2–5 by 0.8–3 millimeters with a broad groove on their upper side. Its Inflorescences occur in clusters of 1–5 on branches, and are organized on slightly hairy peduncles that are 1.5–4 by 0.3–0.7 millimeters. Each inflorescence has up to 2 flowers. Each flower is on a slightly hairy pedicel that is 11–24 by 0.2–0.8 millimeters. The pedicels are organized on a rachis up to 5 millimeters long that have 2–6 bracts. The pedicels have a medial, slightly hairy bract that is 0.5–1 millimeters long. Its flowers are unisexual. Its flowers have 3 free, triangular sepals, that are 1.5–2 by 1.5–2 millimeters. The sepals are hairless on their upper surface, sparsely hairy on their lower surface, and hairy at their margins. Its 6 petals are arranged in two rows of 3. The pale yellow, oval, outer petals are 3–5 by 3–5.5 millimeters with hairless upper and sparsely hairy lower surfaces. The pale yellow, diamond-shaped inner petals have a 2–3.5 millimeter long claw at their base and a 5–9.5 by 2–5 millimeter blade. The inner petals have pointed bases and tips. The inner petals are hairless on their upper surfaces and densely hairy on their lower surfaces. The inner petals have a pair of elliptical, smooth, raised glands on their upper surface. Male flowers have up to 40–58 stamens that are 0.7–0.8 by 0.7–0.8 millimeters. Female flowers have 3–6 carpels that are 2.2–2.7 by 0.8–1.3 millimeters. Each carpel has up to 6 ovules arranged in two rows. The fruit occur in clusters of 3 arranged on slightly hairy peduncles that are 3–4 by 1–2 millimeters. The individual fruit are attached by slightly hairy pedicles that are 24–26 by 1.5 millimeters. The fruit are oval to elliptical and 18–21 by 12–14 millimeters. The fruit have a pointed tip 1 millimeter long. The fruit are smooth, and densely hairy.

=== Reproductive biology ===
The pollen of P. latifolia is shed as permanent tetrads.

== Habitat and distribution ==
It has been observed growing in forests at elevations of 150 meters (490 ft).
