= Pseuduvaria pulchella =

Scientific classification
- Kingdom: Plantae
- Clade: Tracheophytes
- Clade: Angiosperms
- Clade: Magnoliids
- Order: Magnoliales
- Family: Annonaceae
- Genus: Pseuduvaria
- Species: P. pulchella

Binomial name
- Pseuduvaria pulchella (Diels) J.Sinclair

Synonyms
- Orophea pulchella Diels

Species of plant in the soursop family

Pseuduvaria pulchella is a species of plant in the family Annonaceae. It is native to New Guinea. Ludwig Diels, the botanist who first formally described the species using the basionym Orophea pulchella, chose a specific epithet that means “beautiful little” (pulchella) in Latin, but he did not specify to which aspect of the plant he was referring.

== Description ==
It is a small tree reaching 0.3–1 meter (1.0–3.3 ft) in height. The young, brown branches are densely hairy but become hairless as they mature. Its egg-shaped to elliptical, papery leaves are 14–21 cm (5.5–8.3 in) by 3–6 cm (1.2–2.4 in). The leaves have pointed bases and tapering tips, with the tapering portion 17–23 millimeters long. The leaves are hairless on their upper and lower surfaces. The leaves have 12–14 pairs of secondary veins emanating from their midribs. Its very densely hairy petioles are 3–4 by 1–2 millimeters with a broad groove on their upper side. Its Inflorescences are solitary or in pairs on branches, and are organized on densely hairy peduncles that are 3–7 by 0.3 millimeters. Each inflorescence has 1–2 flowers. Each flower is on a densely hairy pedicel that is 3–5 by 0.2–0.5 millimeters. The pedicels are organized on a rachis up to 5 millimeters long that have 4–6 bracts. The pedicels have a medial, very densely hairy bract that is 0.5 millimeters long. Its flowers are male or hermaphroditic. Its flowers have 3 free, triangular sepals, that are 0.5 by 0.7 millimeters. The sepals are hairless on their upper surface, densely hairy on their lower surface, and hairy at their margins. Its 6 petals are arranged in two rows of 3. The purple, oval to elliptical, outer petals are 2–3.5 by 2–2.5 millimeters with slightly hairy upper surfaces and densely hairy lower surfaces. The purple, oval, inner petals have a 1–1.5 millimeter long claw at their base and a 3–3.5 by 1.5–2 millimeter blade. The inner petals have flat bases and pointed tips. The inner petals are hairless on their upper surface, except toward their tip where they are hairy, and densely hairy on their lower surfaces. Male flowers have up to 16 stamens that are 0.5 by 0.5 millimeters. Hermaphroditic flowers have 1 carpels that is 1.5 by 1.4 millimeters and up to 11 stamens that are 0.4–0.5 by 0.4–0.5 millimeters.

=== Reproductive biology ===
The pollen of P. pulchella is shed as permanent tetrads.

== Habitat and distribution ==
It has been observed growing at elevations of 1,000 meters (3,300 ft).
