= Pseuduvaria dielsiana =

Scientific classification
- Kingdom: Plantae
- Clade: Tracheophytes
- Clade: Angiosperms
- Clade: Magnoliids
- Order: Magnoliales
- Family: Annonaceae
- Genus: Pseuduvaria
- Species: P. dielsiana

Binomial name
- Pseuduvaria dielsiana (Lauterb.) J.Sinclair

Synonyms
- Goniothalamus dielsianus Lauterb. Orophea dielsiana (Lauterb.) Diels

Species of plant in the soursop family

Pseuduvaria dielsiana is a species of plant in the family Annonaceae. It is native to New Guinea. Carl Lauterbach, the German botanist who first formally described the species using the synonym Goniothalamus dielsianus, named it in honor of Ludwig Diels, another German botanist who also worked on taxa from New Guinea.

== Description ==
It is a tree reaching 3 meters (9.8 ft) in height. Its oval, moderately papery leaves are 9.5–22 by 3–7.5 centimeters. The leaves have blunt to rounded bases and rounded to tapering tips, with the tapering portion 5–20 millimeters long. The leaves are hairless to sparsely hairy on their upper and lower surfaces except for the midrib which can be sparsely to densely hairy. The margins of the leaves can be fringed with longer hairs. The leaves have 10–18 pairs of secondary veins emanating from their midribs. Its densely hairy petioles are 2–8 by 1–3 millimeters with a broad groove on their upper side. Its Inflorescences are solitary and are organized on indistinct peduncles. Each inflorescence has 1 flower. Each flower is on a densely hairy pedicel that is 4–25 by 0.2 millimeters. The pedicels have a medial, densely hairy bract that is 0.3–0.5 millimeters long. The flowers are unisexual. Its flowers have 3 triangular sepals, that are 0.5–2 by 1–1.5 millimeters. The sepals are hairless on their upper surface, and densely hairy on their lower surface and margins. Its 6 petals are arranged in two rows of 3. The cream-colored or light purple, oval to elliptical, outer petals are 2.5–4.5 by 2–3.5 millimeters with hairless upper surfaces and hairless to densely hairy lower surfaces. The cream-colored or light purple, diamond-shaped, inner petals have a 1–3.5 millimeter long claw at their base and a 4–6.5 by 1.5–3 millimeter blade. The inner petals have pointed tips and bases. The upper surfaces of the inner petals are mostly hairless. The lower surfaces of the inner petals are hairless to densely hairy. Male flowers have up to 18 stamens that are 0.5 by 0.5 millimeters. Female flowers have up to 2 carpels that are 1.9–2.1 by 1.4–1.5 millimeters. Each carpel has 5–6 ovules arranged in a single row. The fruit occur on densely hairy pedicles that are 17–22 by 1–2.5 millimeters. The mature fruit are elliptical and 3.9–4.2 by 1.9–4.1 centimeters. The mature are orange, smooth, and densely hairy. Each fruit has up to 5–6 seeds arranged in a row. The smooth, hemispherical seeds are 10–13 by 6–8 by 3–5 millimeters.

=== Reproductive biology ===
The pollen of P. dielsiana is shed as permanent tetrads.

== Habitat and distribution ==
It has been observed growing in lowland rainforests or low montane forests at elevations of 30 to 1,160 meters (98.4 to 3,810 ft).
