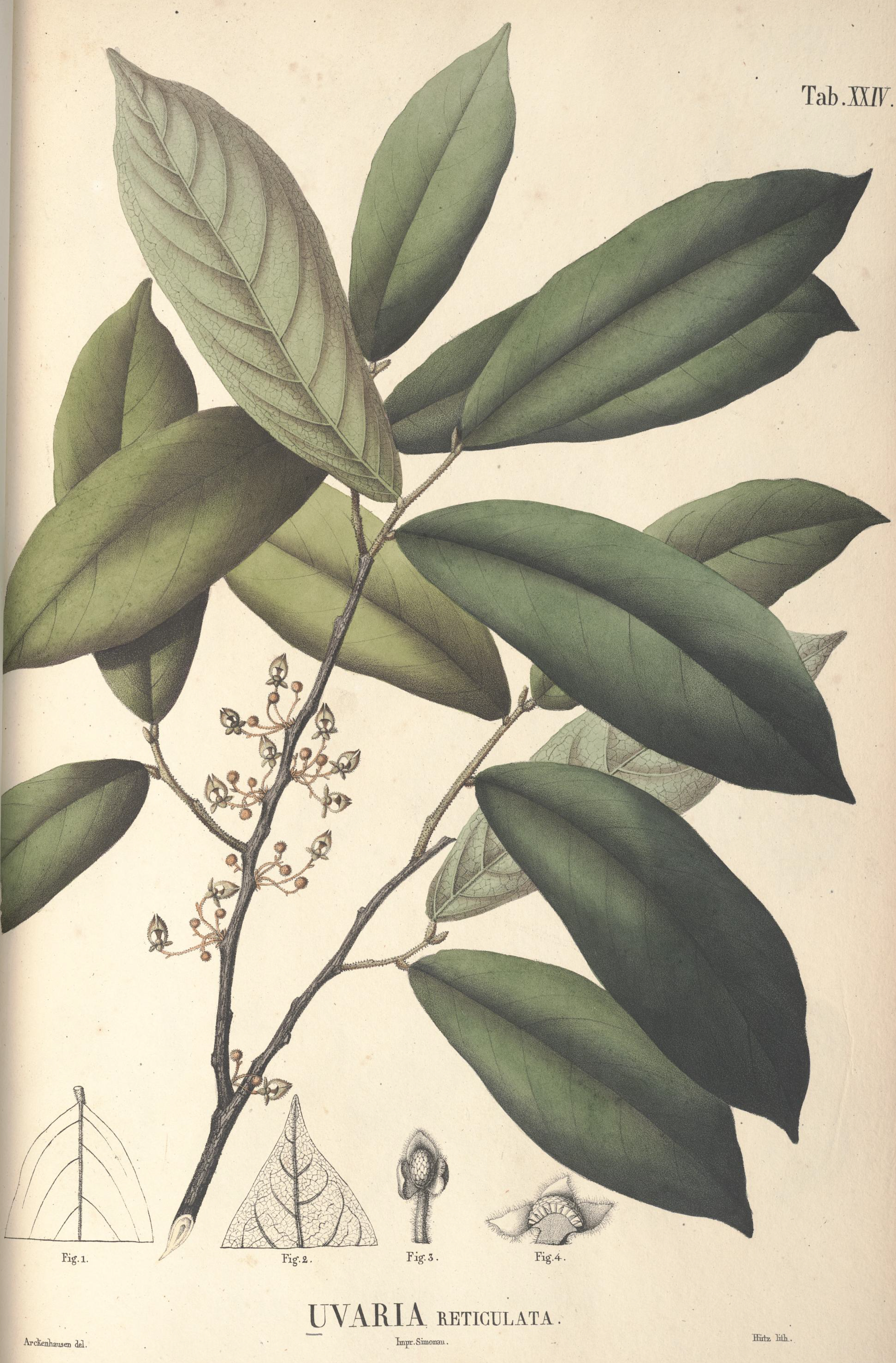
- Botanical illustration of Pseuduvaria reticulata using the synonym Uvaria reticulata

Conservation status
- Least Concern (IUCN 3.1)

Scientific classification
- Kingdom: Plantae
- Clade: Embryophytes
- Clade: Tracheophytes
- Clade: Spermatophytes
- Clade: Angiosperms
- Clade: Magnoliids
- Order: Magnoliales
- Family: Annonaceae
- Genus: Pseuduvaria
- Species: P. reticulata

Binomial name
- Pseuduvaria reticulata (Blume) Miq.

Synonyms
- Mitrephora aperta Teijsm. & Binn. Mitrephora chrysocarpa (Miq.) Boerl. Mitrephora diepenhorstii (Teijsm. & Binn.) Teijsm. & Binn. Mitrephora reticulata (Blume) Hook.f. & Thomson; Mitrephora sumatrana (Miq.) Boerl. Orophea chrysocarpa Miq. Orophea diepenhorstii (Teijsm. & Binn.) Scheff. Orophea reticulata (Blume) Miq. Orophea sumatrana Miq. Pseuduvaria diepenhorstii Teijsm. & Binn. Uvaria reticulata Blume

= Pseuduvaria reticulata =

Species of plant in the soursop family

Pseuduvaria reticulata is a species of plant in the family Annonaceae. It is native to Bangladesh, Borneo, Java, the Lesser Sunda Islands, Myanmar and Sumatra. Carl Ludwig Blume, the botanist who first formally described the species under the basionym Uvaria reticulata, named it after the net-like (reticulatus in Latin) pattern of veins on the underside of its leaves.

== Description ==
It is a tree reaching 25 meters (82 ft) in height. The young, yellow-brown to gray branches are densely hairy and also have sparse lenticels. Its elliptical to egg-shaped, slightly leathery leaves are 10–31 cm (3.9–12 in) by 3–12 cm (1.2–4.7 in). The leaves have pointed, wedge-shaped bases, or flat bases and tapering tips, with the tapering portion 4–20 millimeters long. The leaves are hairless on their upper and lower surfaces. The leaves have 10–22 pairs of secondary veins emanating from their midribs. Its sparsely to very densely hairy petioles are 3–12 by 1.5–4 millimeters with a broad groove on their upper side. Its Inflorescences occur in groups of 5–20 on branches, and are organized on indistinct peduncles. Each inflorescence has a solitary flower. Each flower is on a densely hairy pedicel that is 7–50 by 0.3–0.8 millimeters. The pedicels are organized on a rachis up to 5 millimeters long that have 2 bracts. The pedicels have a medial, densely hairy bract that is 0.5–1.5 millimeters long. Its flowers are unisexual. Its flowers have 3 triangular sepals that are fused at their base. The sepals are 1–2 by 1–2.5 millimeters. The sepals are hairless on their upper surface, very densely hairy on their lower surface, and hairy at their margins. Its 6 petals are arranged in two rows of 3. The orange to yellow, oval to elliptical, outer petals are 1.5–4 by 1.5–3.5 millimeters with hairless upper and very densely hairy lower surfaces. The orange to yellow, heart-shaped inner petals have a 2–7 millimeter long claw at their base and a 5–10 by 3–5.5 millimeter blade. The inner petals have heart-shaped to flat bases and rounded to pointed tips. The inner petals are hairless to densely hairy on their upper surfaces and densely hairy on their lower surfaces. The inner petals have a distinct M-shaped, smooth gland on their upper surface. Male flowers have 31–62 stamens that are 0.5–0.9 by 0.3–0.7 millimeters. Female flowers have 4–8 carpels that are 1.5–3 by 0.8–1.2 millimeters. Each carpel has 1–14 ovules arranged in two rows. Female flowers can have up to 4 sterile stamens, but they are rare. The fruit occur in clusters of 1–7 on hairless to slightly hairy pedicles that are 12–45 by 1–3 millimeters. The yellow-green to brown, globe-shaped fruit are 10–28 by 8–23 millimeters. The fruit have a 0.1–0.5 millimeter-long, pointed tip. The fruit are smooth, and densely hairy. Each fruit has 6–7 hemispherical to lens-shaped seeds that are 10.5–15 by 5.5–8.5 by 2.5–4 millimeters. The seeds are wrinkly.

=== Reproductive biology ===
The pollen of P. reticulata is shed as permanent tetrads.

== Habitat and distribution ==
It has been observed growing in limestone, alluvial and sandstone in forests at elevations of 5–1,400 meters (16–4,600 ft).
