= Pseuduvaria mollis =

Scientific classification
- Kingdom: Plantae
- Clade: Tracheophytes
- Clade: Angiosperms
- Clade: Magnoliids
- Order: Magnoliales
- Family: Annonaceae
- Genus: Pseuduvaria
- Species: P. mollis

Binomial name
- Pseuduvaria mollis (Warb.) J.Sinclair

Synonyms
- Goniothalamus mollis Warb. Mitrephora mollis K.Schum. & Lauterb. Papualthia bracteata Diels; Papualthia mollis (Warb.) Diels

Species of plant in the soursop family

Pseuduvaria mollis is a species of plant in the family Annonaceae. It is native to New Guinea. Otto Warburg, the German-Jewish botanists who first formally described the species using the basionym Goniothalamus mollis, named it after the soft (mollis, in Latin) hairs on its leaves and petals.

== Description ==
It is a tree reaching 15 meters (49 ft) in height. The young, yellow-brown to black branches are very densely covered in hairs. Its elliptical to oval, papery to leathery leaves are 16–40 cm (6.3–16 in) by 6–13 cm (2.4–5.1 in). The leaves have rounded to heart-shaped bases and tapering tips, with the tapering portion 2–17 millimeters long. The leaves are hairless on their upper surfaces and slightly hairy on their lower surfaces. The midribs of the leaves are densely covered in soft hairs. The leaves have 14–24 pairs of secondary veins emanating from their midribs. Its densely hairy petioles are 4–14 by 1.5–4.5 millimeters with a broad groove on their upper side. Its solitary Inflorescences occur on branches, and are organized on peduncles that are 3–5 by 1–2.5 millimeters and densely covered with wooly hairs. Each inflorescence has 1–2 flowers. Each flower is on a pedicel that is 6–13 by 1.5–2 millimeters and very densely covered with wooly hairs. The pedicels are organized on a rachis up to 5 millimeters long that have 4–5 bracts. The pedicels have a medial bract that is 3 millimeters long and very densely covered with wooly hairs. Its flowers are unisexual. Its flowers have 3 oval sepals, that are 3.5–4.5 by 3.5–4.5 millimeters. The sepals are partially fused at their base. The sepals are hairless on their upper surface, covered in very dense wooly hairs on their lower surface, and wooly hairs at their margins. Its 6 petals are arranged in two rows of 3. The light brown, oval, outer petals are 8–8.5 by 7.5 millimeters. The outer petals are hairless on their upper surfaces and covered in very dense wooly hairs on their lower surfaces. The pale yellow, oval inner petals have a 1.5–2 millimeter long claw at their base and a 5.5–7.5 by 3.5–4.5 millimeter blade. The inner petals have slightly rounded bases and pointed tips. The inner petals are hairless on their upper and lower surfaces. Male flowers have up to 126 stamens that are 0.7–1.2 by 0.5–0.8 millimeters. The fruit occur in clusters of 1–4 that are organized on densely hairy peduncles that are 4–12 by 2–4 millimeters. The fruit are attached by densely hairy pedicles that are 5–16 by 205 millimeters. The orange, elliptical fruit are 35–80 by 20–50 millimeters. The fruit are wrinkly, and slightly hairy. Each fruit has up to 20 smooth, lens-shaped seeds arranged in two rows. The seeds are 20–28 by 11–16 by 3–6 millimeters.

=== Reproductive biology ===
The pollen of P. mollis is shed as permanent tetrads.

== Habitat and distribution ==
It has been observed growing in rainforests and river flats at elevations of 60–460 meters (200–1,510 ft).
