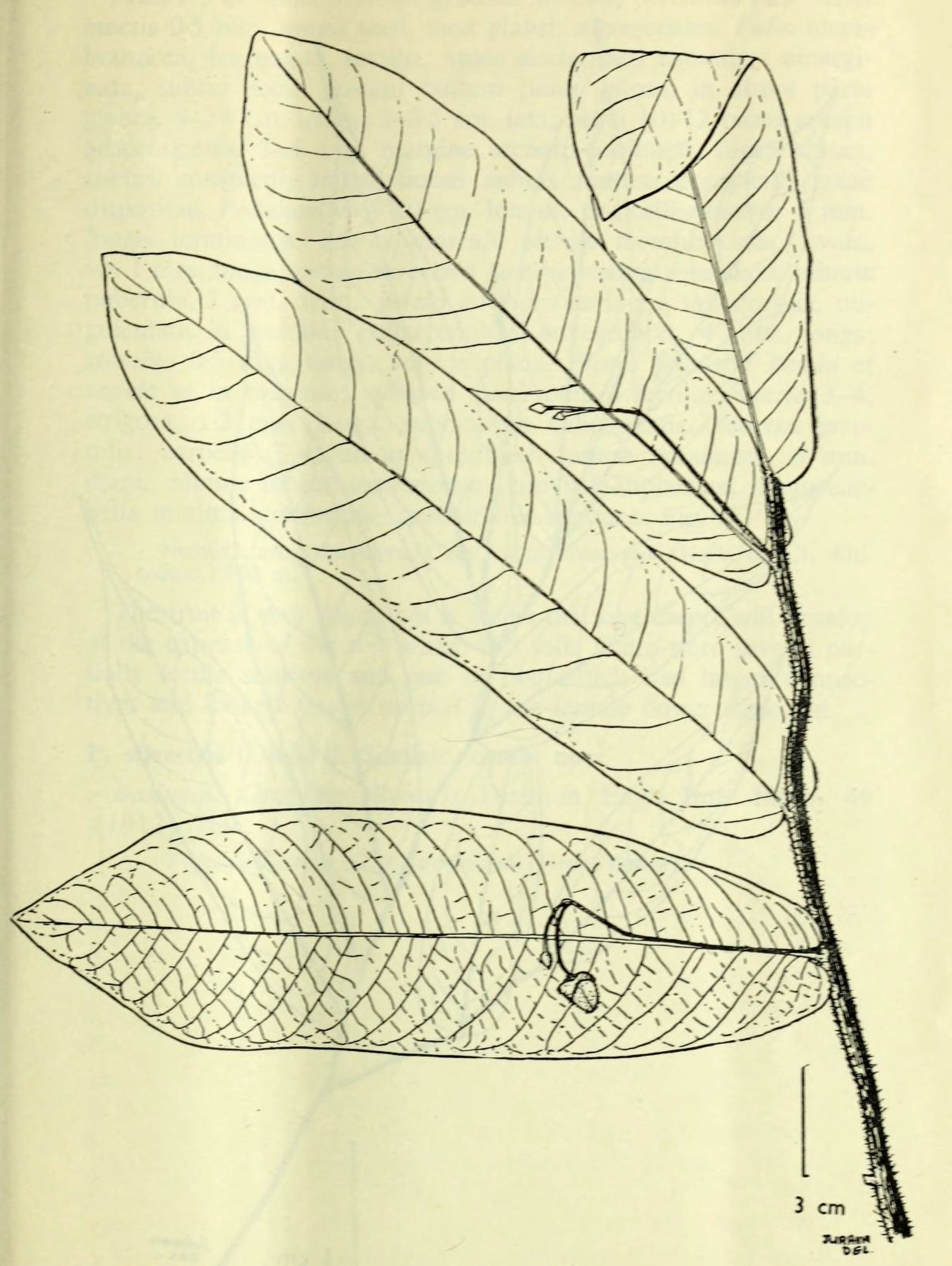
- Botanical illustration of Pseuduvaria nova-guineensis

Scientific classification
- Kingdom: Plantae
- Clade: Tracheophytes
- Clade: Angiosperms
- Clade: Magnoliids
- Order: Magnoliales
- Family: Annonaceae
- Genus: Pseuduvaria
- Species: P. nova-guineensis

Binomial name
- Pseuduvaria nova-guineensis J.Sinclair

= Pseuduvaria nova-guineensis =

Species of plant in the soursop family

Pseuduvaria guineensis is a species of plant in the family Annonaceae. It is native to New Guinea. James Sinclair, the Scottish botanist who first formally described the species, named it after New Guinea where the specimen he examined was collected near Kokoda.

== Description ==
It is a small tree reaching 4 meters (13 ft) in height. The young, gray to brown branches are sparsely to densely hairy. Its elliptical, papery to leathery leaves are 22–35 cm (8.7–13.8 in) by 5–10 cm (2.0–3.9 in). The leaves have heart-shaped bases and tapering tips, with the tapering portion 6–20 millimeters long. The leaves are hairless on their upper surfaces and slightly hairy on their lower surfaces. The leaves have 14–28 pairs of secondary veins emanating from their midribs. Its very densely hairy petioles are 2–6 by 1.5–4 millimeters with a broad groove on their upper side. Its solitary Inflorescences occur on branches, and are organized on very densely hairy peduncles that are 50–100 by 0.8 millimeters. Each inflorescence has up to 5 flowers. Each flower is on a very densely hairy pedicel that is 14–45 by 0.4–0.6 millimeters. The pedicels are organized on a rachis up to 5 millimeters long that have 2–5 bracts. The pedicels have a medial, very densely hairy bract that is 1–2 millimeters long. Its flowers are hermaphroditic. Its flowers have 3 free, triangular sepals, that are 3–3.5 by 1.5–2. The sepals are hairless on their upper surface, densely hairy on their lower surface, and hairy at their margins. Its 6 petals are arranged in two rows of 3. The pale yellow, triangular, outer petals are 14.5–15.5 by 7–8.5 millimeters with hairless upper and densely hairy lower surfaces. The purple to purple-red to dark brown, oval inner petals have a 1–2 millimeter long claw at their base and a 11.5–13 by 7.5–9.5 millimeter blade. The inner petals have flat bases and pointed tips. The inner petals are hairless on their upper and lower surfaces. The inner petals have numerous, irregularly shaped, slightly raised glands on their upper surface. The flowers have up to 90 stamens that are 0.5–1.5 by 0.5–1.4 millimeters. The flowers have up to 5 carpels that are 1–1.5 by 0.8–1 millimeters. Each carpel has 4–8 ovules arranged in two rows. The fruit occur in clusters of 1–2 that are organized on sparsely hairy peduncles that are 100–310 by 0.8–1.5 millimeters. The fruit are attached by sparsely hairy pedicles that are 22–65 by 0.7–2 millimeters. The orange, globe-shaped fruit are 10–30 by 10–30 millimeters. The fruit are wrinkly, and sparsely hairy. Each fruit has 4–8 hemispherical to lens-shaped, wrinkly seeds that are 11–12.5 by 6–9.5 by 3.5–5.5 millimeters. The seeds are arranged in two rows in the fruit.

=== Reproductive biology ===
The pollen of P. nova-guineensis is shed as permanent tetrads.

== Habitat and distribution ==
It has been observed growing in loamy, clay soils in lowland forests at elevations of 35–1,200 meters (110–3,900 ft).
