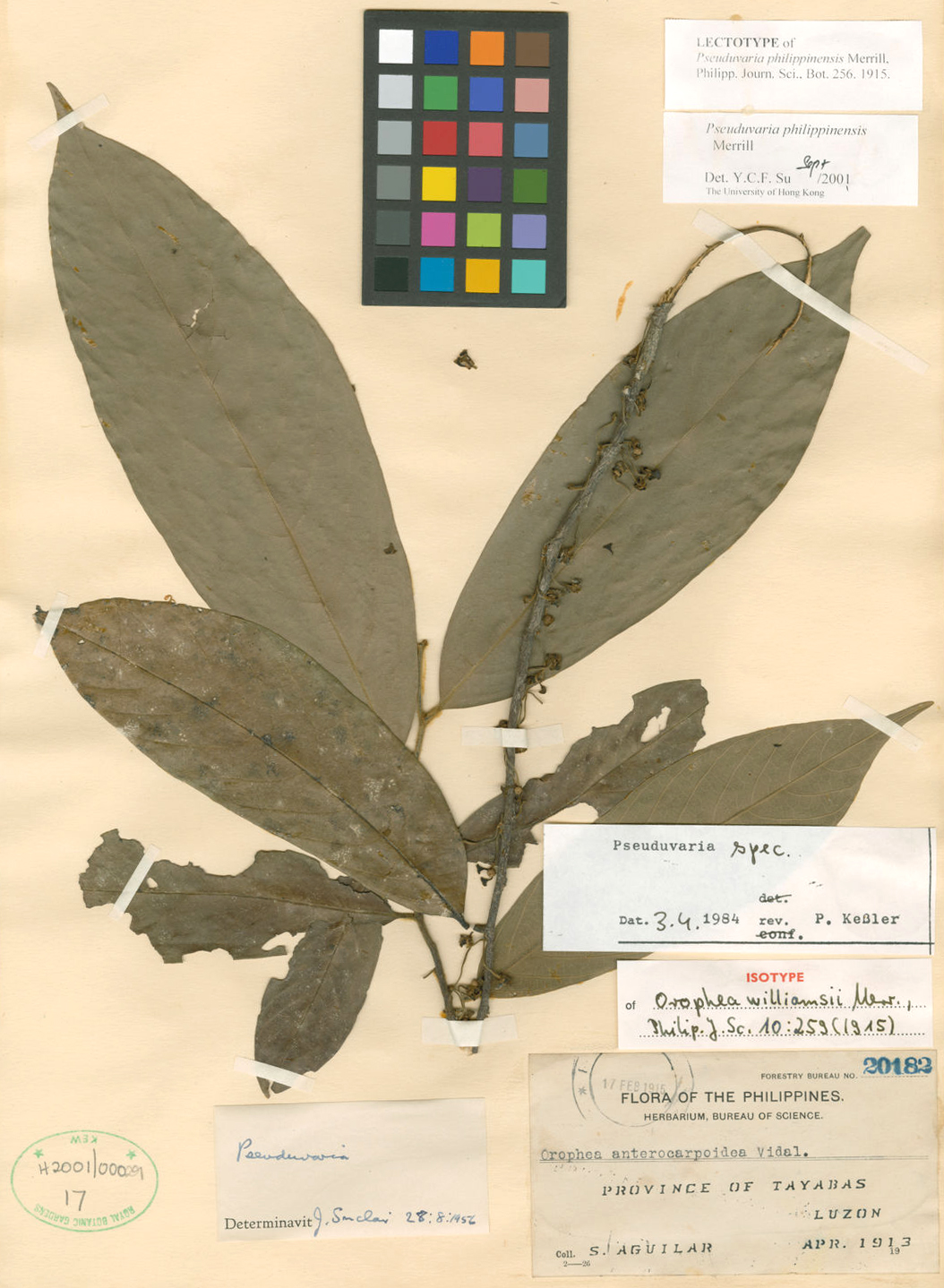
- Herbarium specimen of Pseuduvaria philippinensis

Conservation status
- Vulnerable (IUCN 3.1)

Scientific classification
- Kingdom: Plantae
- Clade: Embryophytes
- Clade: Tracheophytes
- Clade: Spermatophytes
- Clade: Angiosperms
- Clade: Magnoliids
- Order: Magnoliales
- Family: Annonaceae
- Genus: Pseuduvaria
- Species: P. philippinensis

Binomial name
- Pseuduvaria philippinensis Merr.

= Pseuduvaria philippinensis =

Species of plant in the soursop family

Pseuduvaria philippinensis is a species of plant in the family Annonaceae. It is native to the Philippines. Elmer Drew Merrill, the botanist who first formally described the species, named it after the Philippines where the specimen he examined was collected in the Province of Quezon (then called the Province of Tayabas).

== Description ==
It is a tree reaching 18 meters (59 ft) in height. The young, yellow-brown to dark brown branches are densely hairy. Its elliptical, papery to leathery leaves are 9.5–24 cm (3.7–9.4 in) by 2.5–7 cm (1.0–2.8 in). The leaves have flat to pointed bases and tapering tips, with the tapering portion 5–20 millimeters long. The leaves are sparsely hairy on their upper surfaces and densely hairy on their lower surfaces. The leaves have 10–18 pairs of secondary veins emanating from their midribs. Its very densely hairy petioles are 3–11 by 1–2.5 millimeters with a broad groove on their upper side. Its Inflorescences occur in groups of 3–13 on branches, and are organized on indistinct peduncles. Each inflorescence has a solitary flower. Each flower is on a very densely hairy pedicel that is 11–20 by 0.5–1 millimeters. The pedicels are organized on a rachis up to 5 millimeters long that have 2–3 bracts. The pedicels have a medial, very densely hairy bract that is 0.5–1.5 millimeters long. Its flowers are unisexual. Its flowers have 3 free, triangular sepals, that are 0.5–2 by 1–2 millimeters. The sepals are hairless on their upper and lower surfaces, and hairy at their margins. Its 6 petals are arranged in two rows of 3. The blackish-yellow, oval, outer petals are 1–2 by 1–2.5 millimeters. The outer petals have hairless upper surfaces, except near their base, and densely hairy lower surfaces. The inner petals are blackish-yellow, and arch-shaped to inverted heart-shaped. The inner petals have a 2.5–5.5 millimeter long claw at their base and a 4.5–7.5 by 3–5 millimeter blade. The inner petals have flat bases and rounded to slightly notched tips. The inner petals are densely hairy on their upper and lower surfaces. Male flowers have up to 73 stamens that are 0.5–0.8 by 0.4–0.6 millimeters. Female flowers have about 7 carpels that are 1.5–1.8 by 0.6–1 millimeters. Each carpel has 2–9 ovules arranged in a row. Female flowers usually have a sterile stamen. The fruit occur in clusters of 2–6 on densely hairy pedicles that are 13–22 by 1–2.5 millimeters. The fruit are globe-shaped and 11–17 by 9–16 millimeters. The fruit are wrinkly, and very densely hairy. Each fruit has 2–9 wrinkly, hemispherical to lens-shaped seeds that are 7–8.5 by 4–4.5 by 2–3.5 millimeters.

=== Reproductive biology ===
The pollen of P. philippinensis is shed as permanent tetrads.

== Habitat and distribution ==
It has been observed growing in damp habitats in lowland forests at elevations of up to 50 meters (160 ft).
