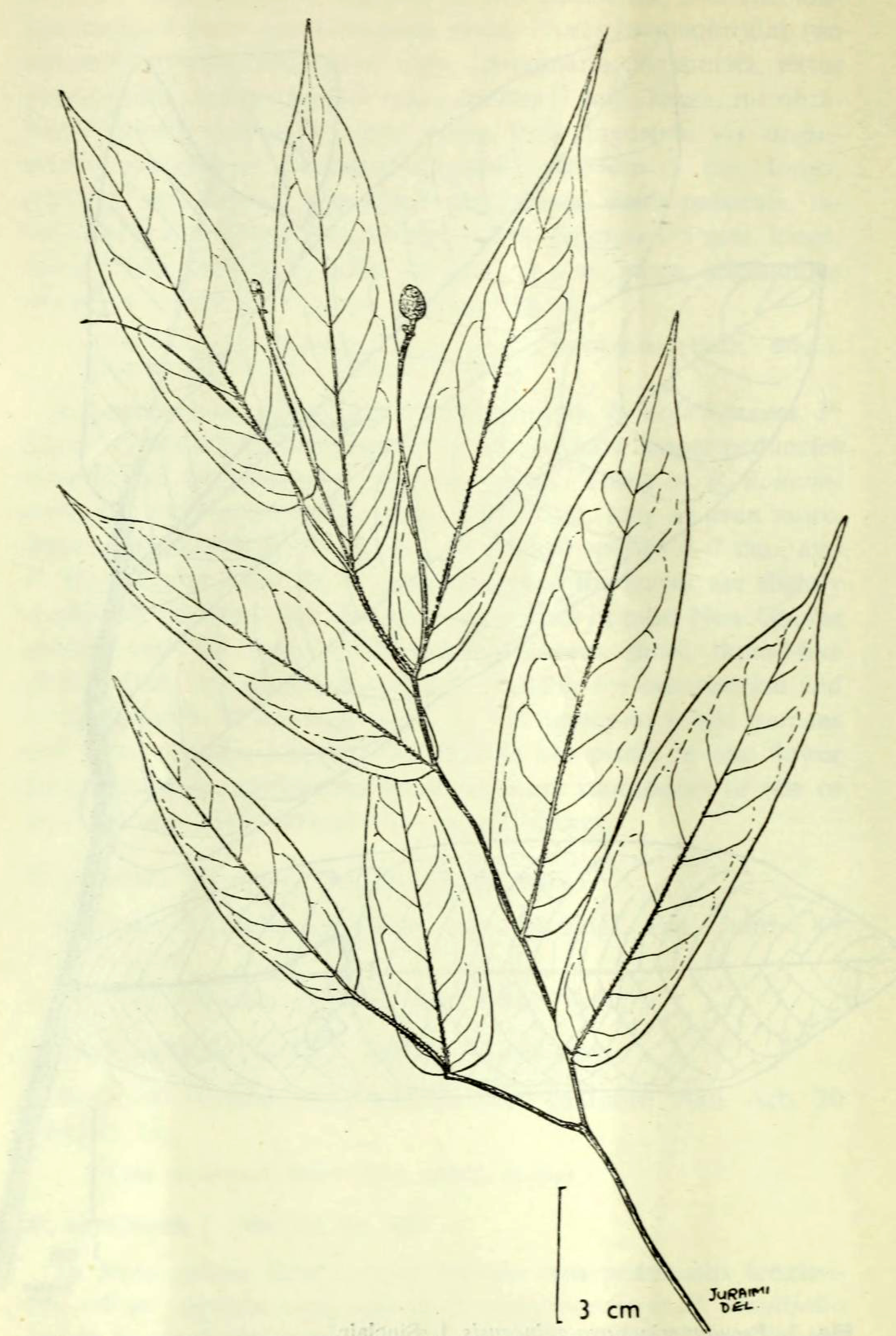
- Botanical illustration of Pseuduvaria sessilifolia

Scientific classification
- Kingdom: Plantae
- Clade: Tracheophytes
- Clade: Angiosperms
- Clade: Magnoliids
- Order: Magnoliales
- Family: Annonaceae
- Genus: Pseuduvaria
- Species: P. sessilifolia

Binomial name
- Pseuduvaria sessilifolia J.Sinclair

= Pseuduvaria sessilifolia =

Species of plant in the soursop family

Pseuduvaria sessilifolia is a species of plant in the family Annonaceae. It is native to New Guinea. James Sinclair, the botanist who first formally described the species, named it after its stalkless (sessili- in Latin) leaves (folium in Latin) which lack petioles.

== Description ==
It is a small tree reaching 3 meters (9.8 ft) in height. The young, dark brown to black branches are densely hairy but become hairless as they mature. Its elliptical to oval, papery to slightly leathery leaves are 7.5–14.5 cm (3.0–5.7 in) by 1.5–3.5 cm (0.6–1.4 in). The leaves have slightly heart-shaped to rounded bases and tapering tips, with the tapering portion 15–38 mm (0.59–1.50 in) long. The leaves are hairless on their upper and lower surfaces. The leaves have 10–26 pairs of secondary veins emanating from their midribs. The leaves lack petioles. Its Inflorescences are solitary on branches, and are organized on slightly hairy peduncles that are 45–95 by 0.2–0.3 millimeters. Each inflorescence has up to 13 flowers. Each flower is on a sparsely to densely hairy pedicel that is 2–9 by 0.3 millimeters. The pedicels are organized on a rachis up to 5 millimeters long that have 2–12 bracts. The pedicels have a medial, densely hairy bract that is 0.4–0.7 millimeters long. Its flowers are unisexual. Its flowers have 3 triangular sepals that are 1–1.5 by 1–2 millimeters and partially fused at their base. The sepals are hairless on their upper surface, sparsely hairy on their lower surface, and hairy at their margins. Its 6 petals are arranged in two rows of 3. The creamy pink, oval, outer petals are 3–4 by 2.5–3.5 millimeters with hairless upper and sparsely hairy lower surfaces. The inner petals are white to cream-white with purple-pink highlights at their bases. The diamond-shaped inner petals have a 1–1.5 millimeter long claw at their base and a 3–4.5 by 2.5–4 millimeter blade. The inner petals have pointed bases and tips. The inner petals are hairless on their upper and densely hairy on their lower surfaces. Male flowers have 31–42 stamens that are 0.7 by 0.3–0.7 millimeters. Female flowers have up to 5 carpels that are 1.2 by 0.7 millimeters. Female flowers have up to 5 sterile stamens. The fruit occur in clusters of 1–2 and are organized on slightly hairy peduncles that are 45–80 by 0.5 millimeters. The fruit are attached by slightly hairy pedicles that are 6–7 by 1–2 millimeters. The orange-yellow, globe-shaped fruit are 13 by 13 millimeters. The fruit are smooth, and sparsely hairy.

=== Reproductive biology ===
The pollen of P. rugosa is shed as permanent tetrads.

== Habitat and distribution ==
It has been observed growing on clay or alluvial soils in primary or disturbed forests, at elevations of 50–1,070 meters (160–3,510 ft).
