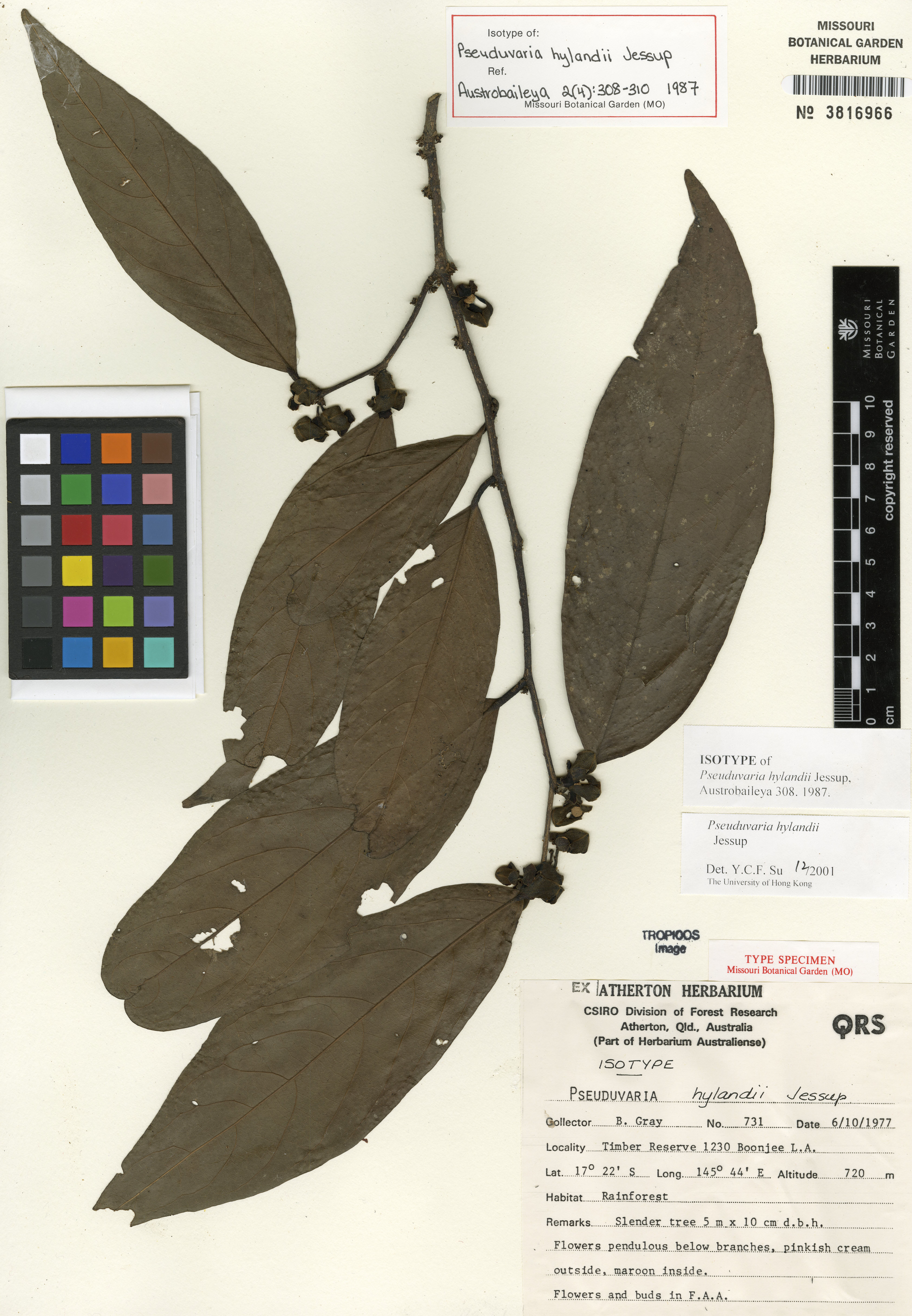
- Herbarium specimen of Pseuduvaria hylandii

Scientific classification
- Kingdom: Plantae
- Clade: Tracheophytes
- Clade: Angiosperms
- Clade: Magnoliids
- Order: Magnoliales
- Family: Annonaceae
- Genus: Pseuduvaria
- Species: P. hylandii

Binomial name
- Pseuduvaria hylandii Jessup

= Pseuduvaria hylandii =

Species of plant in the soursop family

Pseuduvaria hylandii is a species of plant in the family Annonaceae. It is native to Australia. L.W. Jessup, the botanists who first formally described the species, named it after Bernard Hyland an Australian botanist who collected the specimen he examined.

== Description ==
It is a tree reaching 13 meters (43 ft) in height. The young, dark brown to black branches are sparsely covered in hairs and also have many lenticels. Its elliptical, membranous to papery leaves are 13–24 cm (5.1–9.4 in) by 3–6.5 cm (1.2–2.6 in). The leaves have pointed to wedge-shaped bases and tapering tips, with the tapering portion 8–18 millimeters long. The leaves are hairless on their upper and lower surfaces. The leaves have 8–12 pairs of secondary veins emanating from their midribs. Its hairless petioles are 5–13 by 1.5–3 millimeters with a narrow groove on their upper side. Its Inflorescences occur in groups of 2–3 on branches, and are organized on indistinct peduncles. Each inflorescence has a solitary flower. Each flower is on a sparsely hairy pedicel that is 4–12 by 0.5–1 millimeters. The pedicels are organized on a rachis up to 5 millimeters long that have 3–6 bracts. The pedicels have a medial, slightly hairy bract that is 0.5–1.5 millimeters long. Its flowers are unisexual. Its flowers have 3 oval sepals, that are 1.5–3 by 3–3.5 millimeters. The sepals are hairless on their upper surface, densely hairy on their lower surface, and hairy at their margins. Its 6 petals are arranged in two rows of 3. The cream-colored to slightly pink, oval to elliptical, outer petals are 3.5–5.5 by 4–5 millimeters with hairless upper surfaces and very densely hairy lower surfaces. The inner petals are maroon with purple highlights at their edges. The diamond-shaped, inner petals have a 5–7 millimeter long claw at their base and a 10.5–14.5 by 5.5–7 millimeter blade. The inner petals have pointed bases and tips. The inner petals are sparsely to densely hairy on their upper surface and densely hairy on their lower surfaces. The inner petals have two, irregularly shaped, smooth, raised glands on their upper surface. Male flowers have up to 67 stamens that are 1–2 by 0.9–1 millimeters. Female flowers have 23–29 carpels that are 1.5–2.3 by 0.6–1 millimeters. Each carpel has 1–3 ovules arranged in a row. The fruit occur in clusters of 12–16 on slightly hairy pedicles that are 11–16 by 1.5–2.5 millimeters. The orange, mature fruit are elliptical to egg-shaped and 9–17 by 7–12 millimeters. The fruit are smooth, and sparsely to densely hairy. Each fruit has up to 2 spherical seeds that are 8–10 by 7.5–8.5 by 4.5–6.5 millimeters. The seeds are very wrinkly.

=== Reproductive biology ===
The pollen of P. hylandii is shed as permanent tetrads.

== Habitat and distribution ==
It has been observed growing in rocky and clay soils in vine forests at elevations of 400–780 meters (1,310–2,560 ft).

== Uses ==
Oils extracted from its leaves contain high levels of caryophyllene and humulene.
