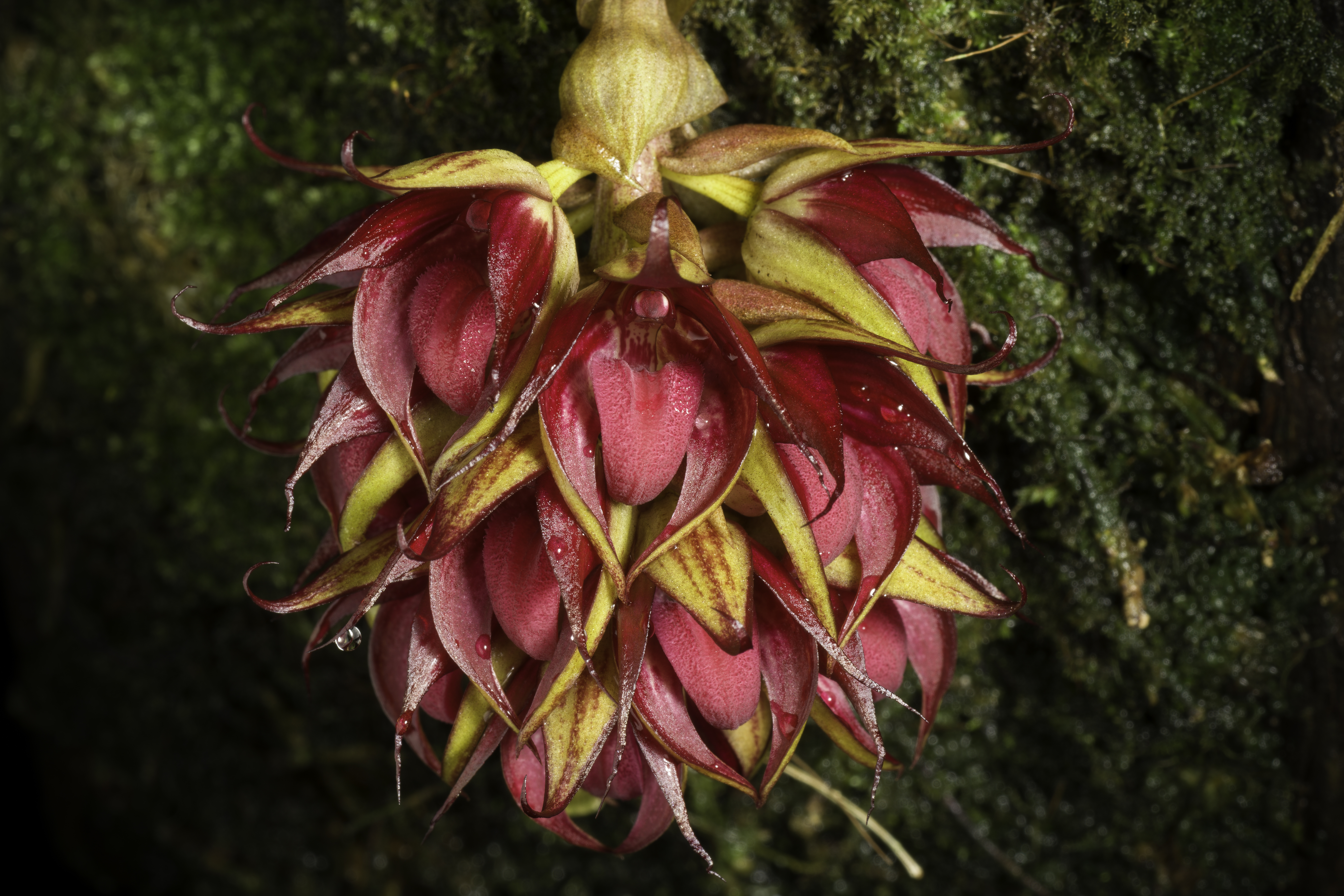
- Bulbophyllum decurviscapum

Scientific classification
- Kingdom: Plantae
- Clade: Tracheophytes
- Clade: Angiosperms
- Clade: Monocots
- Order: Asparagales
- Family: Orchidaceae
- Subfamily: Epidendroideae
- Genus: Bulbophyllum
- Section: Bulbophyllum sect. Beccariana; Pfitzer 1888

Type species
- Bulbophyllum beccarii

Species
- See text

Synonyms
- Bulbophyllum sect. Brachyostele Schlechter 1913; Bulbophyllum sect. Macrobulbon Schlechter 1912; Bulbophyllum sect. Pahudia Schlechter 1911

= Bulbophyllum sect. Beccariana =

Section of flowering plants

Bulbophyllum sect. Beccariana is a section of the genus Bulbophyllum.

== Description ==
Species in this section are epiphytic plants with creeping rhizomes with pseudobulbs carrying a single leaf. Plants bloom with an inflorescence with two or more flowers.

== Distribution ==
Plants from this section are found in Southeast Asia.

== Species ==
Bulbophyllum section Beccariana comprises the following species:

Image	Name	Distribution	Elevation (m)
	Bulbophyllum abangjoei Rusea, Besi & Pungga 2022	Borneo (Sarawak)	
	Bulbophyllum acehense Metusala 2020	Sumatra	1,300–1,600 metres (4,300–5,200 ft)
	Bulbophyllum adelphidium J.J.Verm. 1993	Sumatra	1,400–1,700 metres (4,600–5,600 ft)
	Bulbophyllum aeolium Ames 1914	the Philippines	100–1,800 metres (330–5,910 ft)
	Bulbophyllum agastor Garay, Hamer and Siegrist 1996	New Guinea	820–1,560 metres (2,690–5,120 ft)
	Bulbophyllum alsiosum Ames 1912	Philippines	600–1,300 metres (2,000–4,300 ft)
	Bulbophyllum alticaule Ridl. 1916	New Guinea	759 metres (2,490 ft)
	Bulbophyllum anaclastum J.J.Verm. 1993	Sabah Borneo	1,700–1,900 metres (5,600–6,200 ft)
	Bulbophyllum apertum Schlechter 1906	Thailand, Indonesia, Borneo, Moluccas and Sulawesi	400–1,200 metres (1,300–3,900 ft)
	Bulbophyllum artvogelii J.J.Verm., P.O'Byrne & A.L.Lamb 2015	Sabah, Kalimantan Borneo	800–1,000 metres (2,600–3,300 ft)
	Bulbophyllum beccarii Rchb. f. 1879	Borneo	0–600 metres (0–1,969 ft)
	Bulbophyllum bruneiense J.J.Verm. & A.L.Lamb 2008	Borneo	200 metres (660 ft)
	Bulbophyllum cornutum [Blume]Rchb.f 1861	Borneo, Java and the Philippines	900–1,700 metres (3,000–5,600 ft)
	Bulbophyllum cruentum Garay, Hamer & Siegerist 1992	New Guinea	
	Bulbophyllum cuspidipetalum J.J. Sm. 1908	Borneo and Malaysia	
	Bulbophyllum decurviscapum J.J. Sm. 1932	Borneo	0–1,000 metres (0–3,281 ft)
	Bulbophyllum deviantiae J.J.Verm. & P.O'Byrne 2008	Sulawesi	1,200–1,400 metres (3,900–4,600 ft)
	Bulbophyllum ecornutum J.J. Sm 1914	Thailand, Sumatra, Borneo, Bali and Java	400–1,300 metres (1,300–4,300 ft)
	Bulbophyllum ecornutoides Cootes & W.Suarez 2006	the Philippines	500 metres (1,600 ft)
	Bulbophyllum elevatopunctatum J.J. Sm. 1920	Thailand, peninsular Malaysia and Sumatra	400–1,000 metres (1,300–3,300 ft)
	Bulbophyllum ericssonii Kraenzl. 1893	Malaysian peninsula, Java, Sumatra, Borneo, Moluccas, Sulawesi and New Guinea	760 metres (2,490 ft)
	Bulbophyllum fletcherianum J.G. Fowler 1914	New Guinea	250–800 metres (820–2,620 ft)
	Bulbophyllum foetidum Schltr. 1913	Papua New Guinea	400–1,000 metres (1,300–3,300 ft)
	Bulbophyllum gibbolabium Seidenf. 1979	Thailand	
	Bulbophyllum glebulosum J.J.Verm. & Cootes 2008	the Philippines	
	Bulbophyllum guttatum Schltr. 1913	New Guinea	210–1,300 metres (690–4,270 ft)
	Bulbophyllum haematostictum J.J.Verm. & A.L.Lamb 2008	Sarawak, Brunei and Sabah Borneo	1,300–1,600 metres (4,300–5,200 ft)
	Bulbophyllum hampeliae Cootes, R.Boos & Naive 2016	Philippines (Mindanao)	1,200 metres (3,900 ft)
	Bulbophyllum hoyifolium J.J.Verm.1993	Papua New Guinea	850–1,000 metres (2,790–3,280 ft)
	Bulbophyllum ichthyosme J.J.Verm. 2008	western New Guinea	600 metres (2,000 ft)
	Bulbophyllum incisilabrum J.J.Verm. & P.O'Byrne 2003	Sulawesi	900–1,200 metres (3,000–3,900 ft)
	Bulbophyllum kubahense J.J. Verm. & A. Lamb 2011	Borneo	100–200 metres (330–660 ft)
	Bulbophyllum lasianthum Lindl. 1855	Java, Sumatra, Borneo and Malaysia	0–1,200 metres (0–3,937 ft)
	Bulbophyllum macrobulbum J.J. Sm. 1910	New Guinea	300–400 metres (980–1,310 ft)
	Bulbophyllum magnum J J Verm, Cootes & Suarez 2013	Philippines	1,200 metres (3,900 ft)
	Bulbophyllum mahakamense J.J.Sm.1909	peninsular Malaysia, Sumatra and all of Borneo	0–1,800 metres (0–5,906 ft)
	Bulbophyllum membranifolium Hook. f. 1896	Malaysia (Perak), Sabah, Sarawak, Sumatra and the Philippines	800–2,300 metres (2,600–7,500 ft)
	Bulbophyllum monstrabile Ames 1915	Philippines	500 metres (1,600 ft)
	Bulbophyllum myodes J.J.Verm. 2008	Papua New Guinea	1,500–1,800 metres (4,900–5,900 ft)
	Bulbophyllum nabawanense J.J.Wood & A.L.Lamb 1994	Borneo	490 metres (1,610 ft)
	Bulbophyllum ornatum Schltr. 1913	New Guinea	900 metres (3,000 ft)
	Bulbophyllum orthosepalum Verm. 1993	Papua and New Guinea	
	Bulbophyllum otochilum J.J.Verm 1991	Borneo	1,300 metres (4,300 ft)
	Bulbophyllum pachyglossum Schltr., 1919	New Guinea	1,500–2,000 metres (4,900–6,600 ft)
	Bulbophyllum pahudii [De Vr] Rchb.f 1861	Java	850–1,200 metres (2,790–3,940 ft)
	Bulbophyllum phalaenopsis J.J. Sm. 1937	New Guinea	500 metres (1,600 ft)
	Bulbophyllum pustulatum Ridl. 1903	Peninsular Malaysia and Borneo	
	Bulbophyllum refractilingue J.J. Sm. 1931	Borneo	100–400 metres (330–1,310 ft)
	Bulbophyllum reticulatum Bateman 1866	Borneo	
	Bulbophyllum rheophyton J.J.Verm. & Tsukaya 2011	Kalimantan Borneo	
	Bulbophyllum rugosum Ridl. 1896	Malaysia, Sumatra and Borneo	1,000–1,700 metres (3,300–5,600 ft)
	Bulbophyllum sanguineomaculatum Ridl. 1896	Peninsular Malaysia, Borneo, Sulawesi and the Philippines	100–1,300 metres (330–4,270 ft)
	Bulbophyllum signatum J.J. Vermeulen 1996	Sarawak, Borneo	50 metres (160 ft)
	Bulbophyllum simii J.J.Verm. & A.L.Lamb 2008	Sarawak and Sabah Borneo	1,400–1,450 metres (4,590–4,760 ft)
	Bulbophyllum singaporeanum Schltr. 1911	Singapore, Malaysia (Johore and Borneo)	0–500 metres (0–1,640 ft)
	Bulbophyllum stictosepalum Schltr. 1913	New Guinea	1,000–1,200 metres (3,300–3,900 ft)
	Bulbophyllum striatum (Griff.) Rchb.f. 1861	China (Yunnan), Assam, Bangladesh, Thailand and Vietnam	1,500–2,330 metres (4,920–7,640 ft)
	Bulbophyllum subumbellatum Ridl. 1895	Peninsular Malaysia and Borneo	0–250 metres (0–820 ft)
	Bulbophyllum sungaiutikense F. H. Kurniawan, Yudistira & Mustaqim 2022	Indonesia (Kalimantan Barat)	70–100 metres (230–330 ft)
	Bulbophyllum taeter J.J.Verm. 1996	Borneo	10 metres (33 ft)
	Bulbophyllum tothastes J.J.Verm. 1991	Brunei, Sabah and Kalimantan Borneo	5–1,300 metres (16–4,265 ft)
	Bulbophyllum uniflorum (Blume) Hassk. 1844	Sumatra, Java, Borneo and the Philippines	600–1,800 metres (2,000–5,900 ft)
	Bulbophyllum univenum J.J.Verm. 1993	Sulawesi	400 metres (1,300 ft)
	Bulbophyllum wakoi Howcroft 1999	eastern New Guinea	800–1,600 metres (2,600–5,200 ft)
