= Odoardo Beccari =

Italian botanist and naturalist (1843–1920)

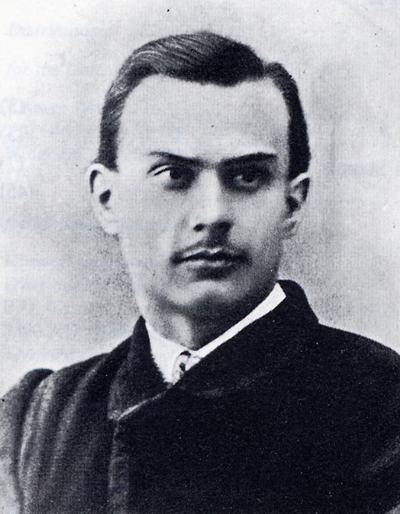
- Born: 16 November 1843
- Died: 25 October 1920 (aged 76)
- Known for: discovery of Amorphophallus titanum
- Scientific career
- Fields: Botany
- Author abbrev. (botany): Becc.

Odoardo Beccari (16 November 1843 – 25 October 1920) was an Italian botanist famous for his discoveries in Indonesia, New Guinea, and Australia. He has been called the greatest botanist to ever study Malesia. The standard author abbreviation Becc. is used to indicate this person as the author when citing a botanical name.

== Life ==
=== Youth and education (1843–1864) ===
Odoardo Beccari was born in Florence as the third child of Giuseppe di Luigi Beccari and the first child of Antonietta Minucci. After he lost his mother in early infancy and his father in 1849, he was brought up by a maternal uncle Minuccio Minucci.

From 1853–1861, he attended the prestigious secondary school Real Collegio in Lucca. Here, one of his teachers was abbot Ignazio Mezzetti (1821–1876), a passionate collector of botanical specimens, who inspired him to pursue botany and assemble a herbarium. He later named the genus Mezzettia in his honor.

In August 1861, he commenced his studies at the University of Pisa. Here he quickly captured the attention of the naturalists Giuseppe Meneghini and Pietro Savi. Very unusually, Savi made him assistant to the chair already in 1831.

Beccari, however, was disappointed with the conventionality of the scientists in Pisa. Therefore, he quit his position there and changed to the University of Bologna in March 1864, where he graduated in July of the same year.

=== First voyage to Borneo (1865–1868) ===
After finishing his studies, Beccari got to know the young Giacomo Doria in Genoa, who had traveled widely in Mesopotamia, and the two decided to conduct an expedition to Sarawak in northern Borneo, which was then poorly explored.

To prepare for this voyage, Beccari stayed in London from February–April 1865 to study the natural history collections there, in particular at the Royal Botanical Gardens at Kew. There, he also met Charles Darwin, William and Joseph Hooker, as well as James Brooke, the first rajah of Sarawak.

Beccari departed from Southampton on 4 April 1865, meeting Doria in Suez. Calling in Aden, Ceylon and Singapore, the two reached Kuching, the capital of Sarawak, on 19 June 1865. For the first three months, they were also accompanied by Beccari's brother Gioavanni Battista, who then continued to Japan. After a short productive period, Doria's health worsened dramatically by March 1866, forcing him to return to Italy. He worked mostly in a hut in the forest some 80 km from Kuching, in today's Kubah National Park. In 1867, he visited Batang Lupar, hunting and studying Orangutans. Later in 1867, he also conducted a long and risky expedition into the interior of Sarawak.

In 1866 he discovered and drew in his notebook the plant Thismia neptunis of the family Thismiaceae; only after 151 years, in 2017, was this discovery confirmed. He also discovered a new species of Rafflesia, the largest-flowered plant genus, which he called Rafflesia tuan-mudae in honor of Charles Brooke, the second White Rajah of Sarawak, who at the time of the plant’s discovery held the Malay court title Tuan Muda Sarawak ("Young Rajah of Sarawak").

Beccari contracted Malaria and Elephantiasis and had to leave in January 1868, arriving in Italy on 2 March.

=== Florence and Africa 1868–1871 ===
Back in Florence, Beccari published, on his own costs, a journal titled Nuovo Giornale Botanico Italiano, which he edited from 1868–1871, which published original research by the most important Italian botanists of the day, including Beccari's own descriptions of his collections made in Borneo. Before his expedition to New Guinea, Beccari handed the management of the journal to Teodoro Caruel.

He also published his results in Bolletino della Società Geografica Italiana. He collaborated with specialists to study particular groups such as seagrasses with P. Ascherson, pteridophytes with Vincenzo de Cesati, mosses with Hampe, lichens with August von Krempelhuber etc.

From February–October 1870, Beccari joined an expedition alongside geologist Arturo Issel and zoologist Orazio Antinori to Eritrea. This came just two years after the purchase of Assab marked the beginning of the Italian colonization of Eritrea which would come into full swing in the 1880s. Apart from Assab, the party also visited the country of the Bilen people, then called Bogos.

=== Expedition to New Guinea (1871–1876) ===
On 26 November 1871 Beccari departed on a voyage to New Guinea, then hardly explored, together with the ornithologist Luigi D'Albertis. Since Western New Guinea was then already claimed by the Dutch, the voyagers had to call at Batavia (Jakarta) to ask for permission for their scientific voyage and get hold of official maps. They also visited the botanical garden at Buitenzorg (Bogor), Java and Beccari climbed Mount Pangrango.

By ship, the party, visiting on their way the islands Flores, Timor and Ambon, reached Sorong on the western part of the Bird's Head Peninsula of New Guinea in April 1872, 40 days after departing Ambon. In July, they left Sorong, reaching Mansinam Island further to the east after 20 days. They especially studied the area near Mount Arfak (2,955 m). After D'Albertis had fallen seriously ill, and they had managed to return to Ambon, he departed with the Italian corvette Vettor Pisani which they chanced upon there. In total, Beccari had collected about 700 plant species during his voyage to New Guinea.

On his own way back, he visited the Aru and Kai Islands, where he collected further specimens. In the Kai Islands, he suffered a shipwreck, but could save all his collections. He then continued to Sulawesi, traveling around the island and reaching Makassar on 15 August 1874. Beccari's funds were running out at that time, but after he had written earlier in the year to Doria in Genoa asking for help in acquiring funding, his friend convinced the city council of Genoa to finance a second expedition towards New Guinea.

Since the season was not conducive to an expedition to New Guinea, he spent the summer in Bali, Surabaja, Semarang, then proceeded through the interior of Java to Bogor to sort his collections. He left Jakarta in October and sailed to Ternate with a crew of 10. He visited many parts of northern West Papua, such as the Schouten Islands, Dorei (Manokwari) and Seram. He also climbed one of the summits of Mount Arfak. In July, a breakout of Beri-Beri among the crew that ended up killing the majority of them forced an early end to the expedition and a return to Ternate. From November 1875 to January 1876, Beccari accompanied a Dutch bathymetric survey, which allowed him to visit places as far as the Yos Sudarso Bay.

Beccari left Ternate for Jakarta in March 1876 and arrived in Florence in June, where he received many honors.

=== Third Malesian Voyage (1877–1878) ===
After one year in Florence, Beccari decided to make another long voyage to Malesia, accompanied this time by Enrico Alberto d'Albertis, a cousin of Luigi D'Albertis. The first part of the trip took the two through India via Singapore and Kuching to Australia. Enrico d'Albertis then returned directly while Beccari made botanical studies in West Sumatra, especially around Mount Singgalang, where he amassed a collection of about 1,000 species. He returned to Florence in late December 1878. Among other plants, he discovered Amorphophallus titanum on this voyage.

=== Life in Italy (1879–1920) ===
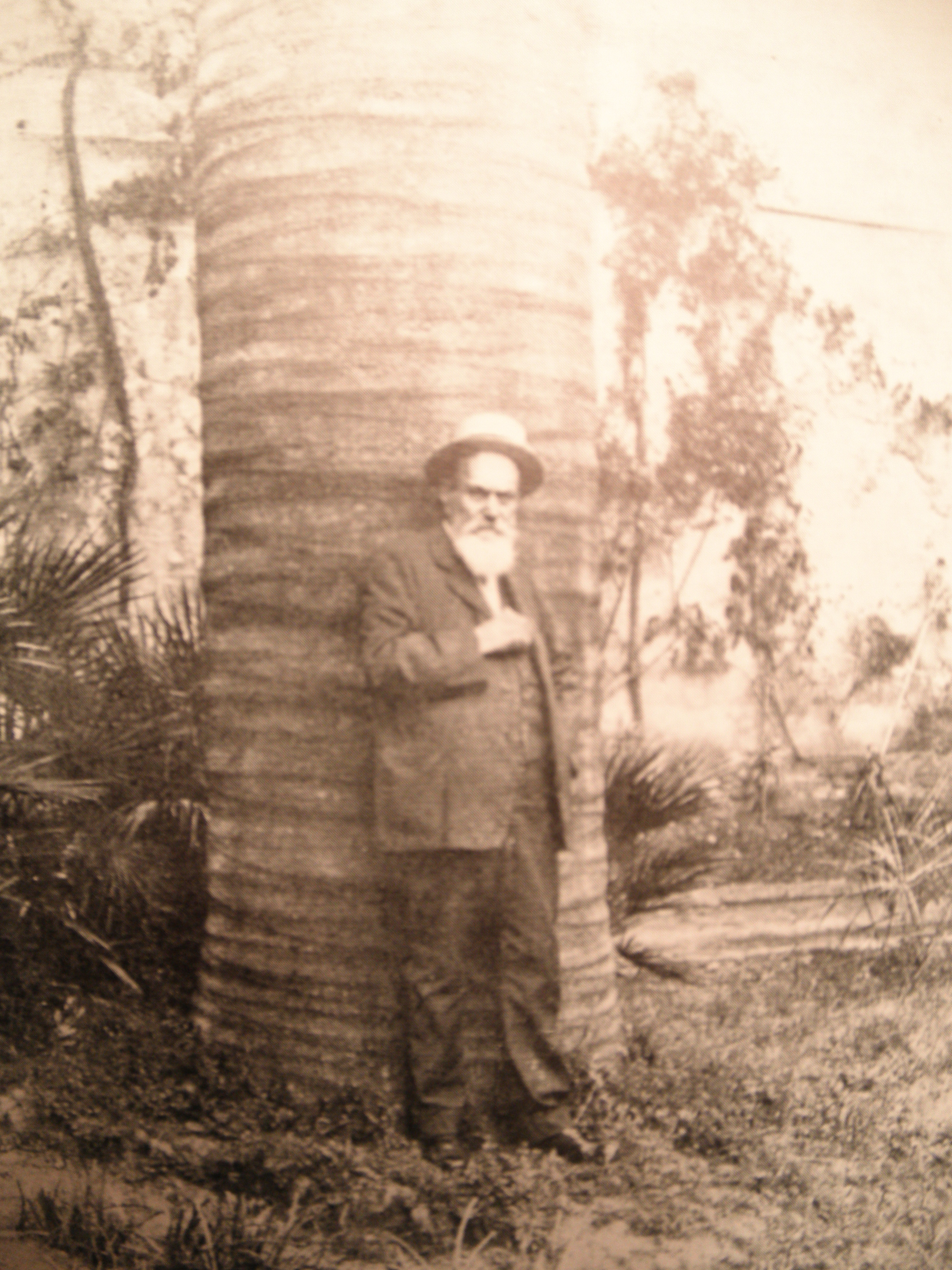
Beccari in 1910

Between 1878 and 1879, Beccari was Director of the Botanical Collections and Garden of the Royal Museum of Physics and Natural History of Florence (he was appointed while on his voyage). He resigned after one year due to disagreements about the source of financing for the sale of his plant collection and the removal of the large existing collections to a new building.

In January 1888, Beccari married Nella Goretti de Flamini. They had four sons: Nello, Dino, Baccio and Renzo. Nello Beccari became an anatomist in his own right. They lived in the Castello di Bisarno, a villa near Florence.

He began to publish a large work, Malesia, mainly detailing results from the study of his collection, but the publication was stopped after some volumes due to lack of funds. In May 1897 he was visited in Florence by Margaret Brooke, the ranee of Sarawak, who inspired him to write a book about his explorations in Borneo, which became Nelle foreste di Borneo, published in 1902.

In his last years, he mainly studied palms, basing his research on specimens sent to him from all over the world, publishing works such as Asiatic Palms (1908) and Palme del Madagascar descritte ed illustrate (1912). For example, Beccari first discovered and described Trachycarpus takil, the Kumaon windmill palm. He originally mistook it for a known T. fortunei variant, thus missed having it named after him. Trachycarpus takil is believed to be the hardiest trunking palm on earth.

He died on 25 October 1920 in Florence, aged 77.

== Legacy ==
Beccari's botanical collection now forms part of the Museo di Storia Naturale di Firenze. While the greatest part of Beccari's archive is preserved at the University of Florence, some travel notes can be found in the library of the Museo Galileo.

The botanical journal Beccariana from Herbarium Manokwariense, Universitas Negeri Papua (UNIPA), Manokwari, Papua Barat, Indonesia, is named after him. See below for a list of species named after Beccari.

In 2020/21 the Ministry of Tourism, Arts and Culture, Sarawak, funded the Beccari Centenary. This included a series of talks, the Beccari Discovery Trail at Matang, and a discovery trail with interpretive signs at Kubah National Park.

== Selected works ==
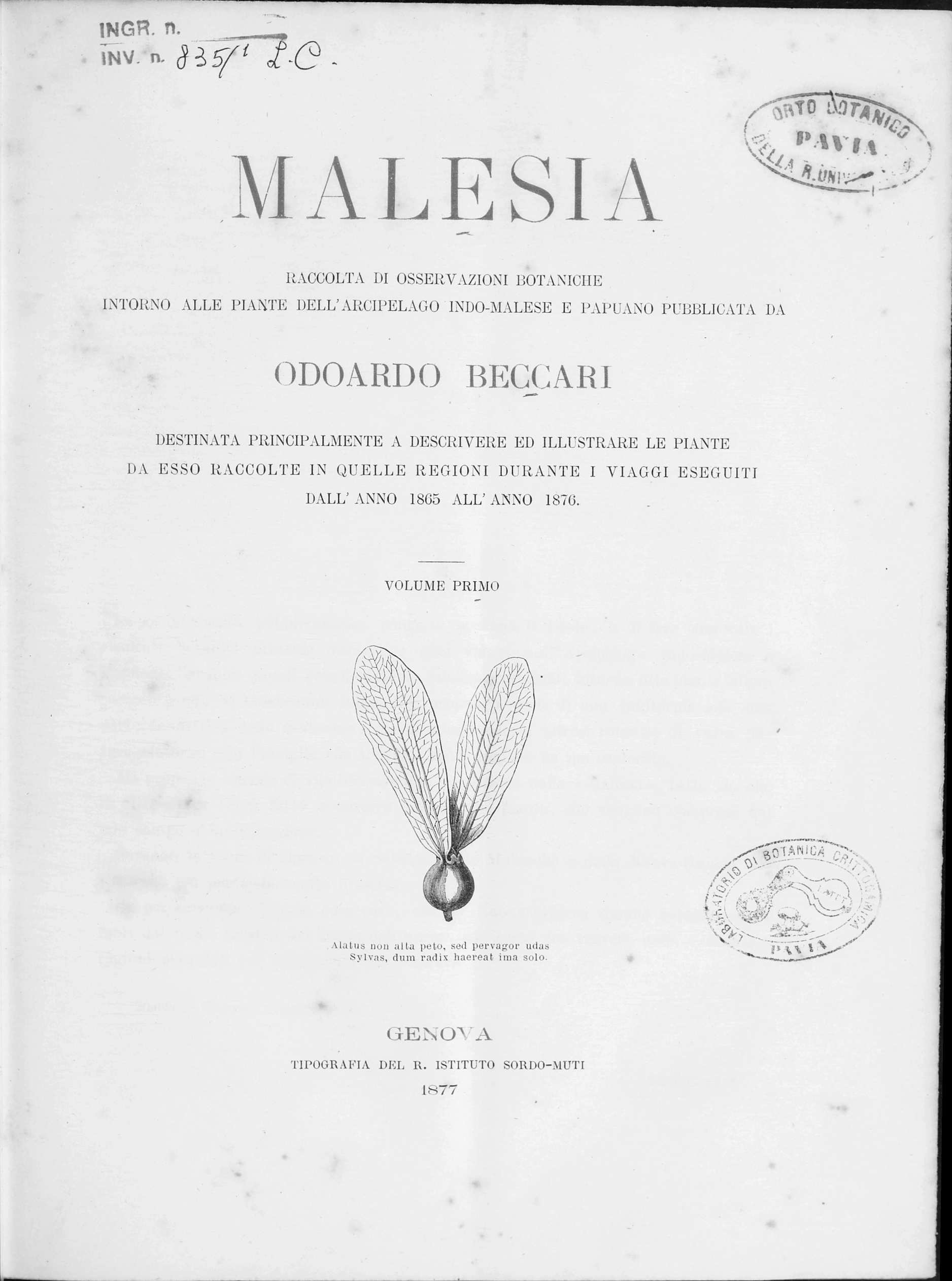
Malesia, vol. 1, 1877

- Beccari, O (1877–1889). Malesia: raccolta di osservazioni botaniche intorno alle piante dell'arcipelago Indo-Malese e Papuano pubblicata da Odoardo Beccari, destinata principalmente a descrivere ed illustrare le piante da esso raccolte in quelle regioni durante i viaggi eseguiti dall'anno 1865 all'anno 1878 3 vols. Genoa: R. Istituto Sordo-Muti.
  - Malesia (in Italian). Vol. 1. Genova: 1777. 1877–1883.
  - Malesia (in Italian). Vol. 2. Genova: Tipografia dell'Istituto Sordomuti. 1884–1886.
  - Malesia (in Italian). Vol. 3. Genova: 1877-1883. 1886–1890.
- Nelle Foreste di Borneo. Viaggi e ricerche di un naturalista, S. Landi, Florence, 1902.
- Wanderings in the great forests of Borneo; travels and researches of a naturalist in Sarawak, A. Constable, London, 1904.
- Asiatic Palms (1908).
- Palme del Madagascar descritte ed illustrate (1912).
- Nova Guinea, Selebes e Molucche. Diari di viaggio ordinati dal figlio Prof. Dott. Nello Beccari, La Voce, Florence, 1924.

== Eponyms ==
=== Plants ===
- Beccarianthus, a genus in the family Melastomataceae
- Beccarinda, a genus in the family Gesneriaceae
- Beccariophoenix, a genus in the family Arecaceae
- Aglaia beccarii, a tree in the family Meliaceae
- Alocasia beccarii, a plant in the family Araceae
- Bulbophyllum beccarii, an orchid
- Caloglossa beccarii, an algae
- Coelogyne odoardi, an orchid
- Dacrydium beccarii, a conifer in the family Podocarpaceae
- Dryobalanops beccarii, a tree in the family Dipterocarpaceae
- Durio beccarianus, a species of durian
- Haplolobus beccarii, a plant in the family Burseraceae
- Holochlamys beccarii, a plant in the family Araceae
- Lithocarpus beccarianus, a tree in the family Fagaceae
- Musa beccarii, a wild banana in the family Musaceae
- Myrmecodia beccarii, a plant in the family Rubiaceae
- Myrtella beccarii, a plant in the family Myrtaceae
- Palaquium beccarianum, a tree in the family Sapotaceae
- Palaquium beccarii, a tree in the family Sapotaceae
- Pritchardia beccariana, a tree in the family Arecaceae
- Pseuduvaria beccarii, a plant in the family Annonaceae
- Rhaphidophora beccarii, a plant in the family Araceae
- Tristaniopsis beccarii, a plant in the family Myrtaceae

=== Animals ===
- Acanthopelma beccarii, a tarantula
- Carlia beccarii, a skink
- Clinidium beccarii, a ground beetle in the family Carabidae
- Cochoa beccarii, a bird in the family Turdidae
- Conraua beccarii, frog in the family Ranidae
- Crocidura beccarii, a shrew
- Draco beccarii, a "flying dragon" lizard
- Emballonura beccarii, a bat in the family Emballonuridae
- Gallicolumba beccarii, a bird in the family Columbidae
- Harpesaurus beccarii, a lizard in the family Agamidae
- Margaretamys beccarii, a rat in the family Muridae
- Mormopterus beccarii, a bat in the family Molossidae
- Otus beccarii, an owl in the family Strigidae
- Scopula beccarii, a moth in the family Geometridae
- Sericornis beccarii, a bird in the family Acanthizidae
- Tropidophorus beccarii, a skink
- Varanus beccarii, a monitor lizard
