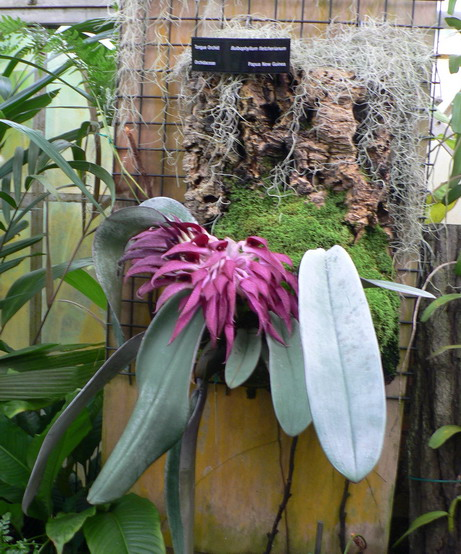
- Bulbophyllum fletcherianum at Melbourne Royal Botanic Gardens.

Scientific classification
- Kingdom: Plantae
- Clade: Tracheophytes
- Clade: Angiosperms
- Clade: Monocots
- Order: Asparagales
- Family: Orchidaceae
- Subfamily: Epidendroideae
- Genus: Bulbophyllum
- Species: B. fletcherianum

Binomial name
- Bulbophyllum fletcherianum Rolfe

Synonyms
- Cirrhopetalum fletcherianum (Rolfe) Rolfe (1915); Bulbophyllum spiesii Garay (1990)

= Bulbophyllum fletcherianum =

Tongue orchid

Species of orchid

Bulbophyllum fletcherianum, the tongue orchid, Fletcher's bulbophyllum or Spies' bulbophyllum, is a rare orchid native to southern New Guinea. It prefers sunny rock outcrops or mossy tree branches, but besides being lithophytic or epiphytic, it can also be pseudo-terrestrial. The tongue orchid requires high humidity and moist roots.

It is one of the largest species of orchid in the world, with leaves growing to almost 1.8 metres (5 ft 11 in) or even 2.1 m (6 ft 11 in) with a width of up to 30 cm (12 in) from a pseudobulb that is "often larger than tennis balls". The leaf is pendant and can be green, or purple with green edges, and is the largest leaf of any known orchid. It is allied to other large orchid species such as B. phalaenopsis and B. macrobulbon.

The flowers are maroon and spike-shaped, and release an overpowering aroma which attracts blowflies and carrion beetles for pollination. The fragrance of these flowers, like those of B. beccarii, have been compared to a whole herd of dead elephants.

== Melbourne Royal Botanic Gardens ==
The specimen at the Tropical House, Melbourne Royal Botanic Gardens was collected in Papua New Guinea in the early 1970s by a local orchid collector, and is mounted on cork oak. As of 2006, it had flowered just three times: in 1980, 2002, and 2005.
