= Mezzettia herveyana =

Conservation status
- Critically Endangered (IUCN 2.3)

Scientific classification
- Kingdom: Plantae
- Clade: Tracheophytes
- Clade: Angiosperms
- Clade: Magnoliids
- Order: Magnoliales
- Family: Annonaceae
- Genus: Mezzettia
- Species: M. herveyana

Binomial name
- Mezzettia herveyana Oliver

Species of tree

Mezzettia herveyana is a species of plant in the family Annonaceae. It is a tree endemic to Peninsular Malaysia.
