= Acanthopelma rufescens =

Scientific classification
- Kingdom: Animalia
- Phylum: Arthropoda
- Subphylum: Chelicerata
- Class: Arachnida
- Order: Araneae
- Infraorder: Mygalomorphae
- Family: Theraphosidae
- Genus: Acanthopelma
- Species: A. rufescens

Binomial name
- Acanthopelma rufescens F. O. P-Cambridge, 1897

Species of spider

Acanthopelma rufescens is a species of spider belonging to the family Theraphosidae (tarantulas). It is native to Central America. This species was described by F.O. Pickard-Cambridge in 1897.
