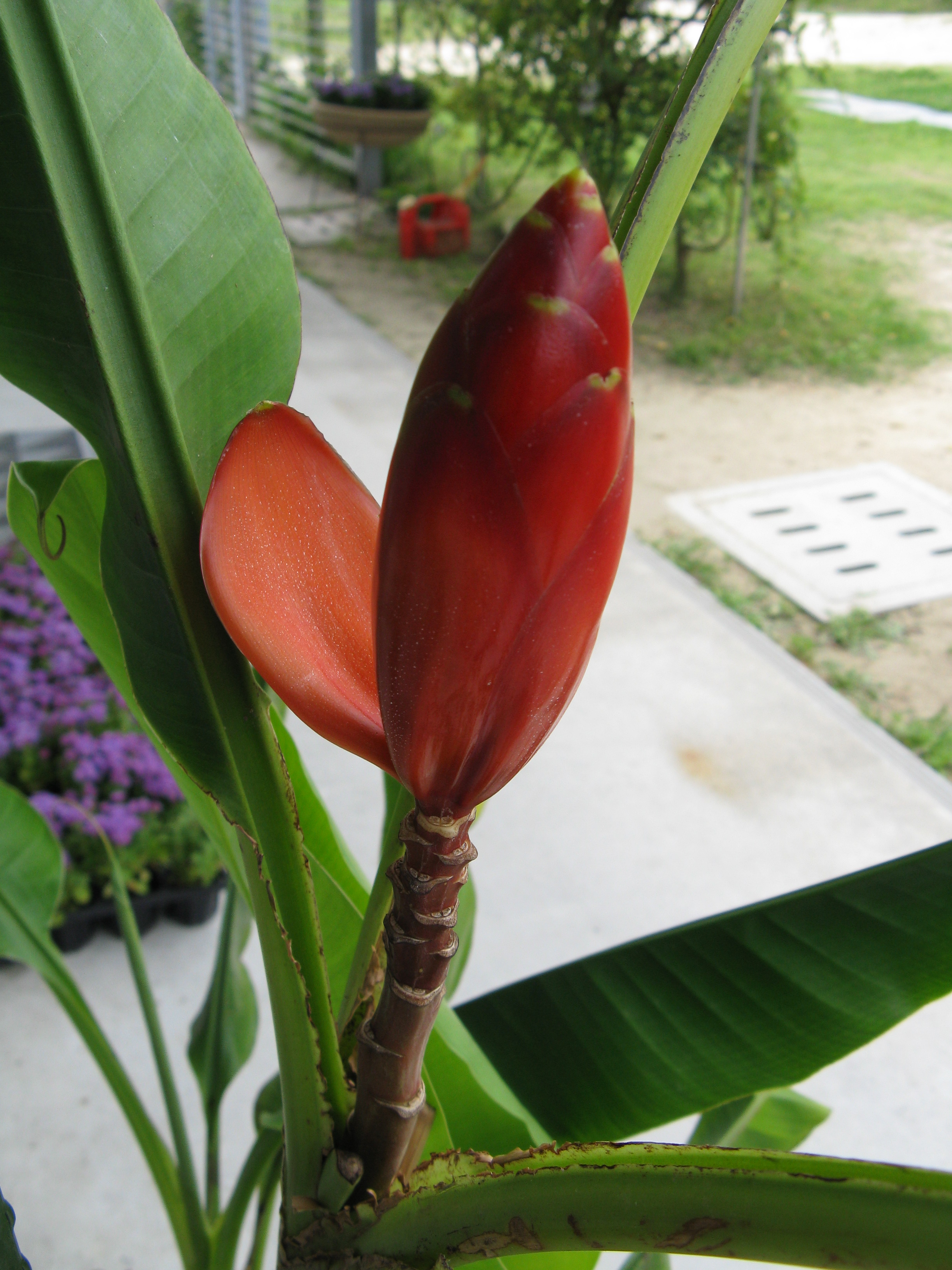
- M. beccarii subsp. hottana

Conservation status
- Least Concern (IUCN 3.1)

Scientific classification
- Kingdom: Plantae
- Clade: Embryophytes
- Clade: Tracheophytes
- Clade: Spermatophytes
- Clade: Angiosperms
- Clade: Monocots
- Clade: Commelinids
- Order: Zingiberales
- Family: Musaceae
- Genus: Musa
- Section: Musa sect. Callimusa
- Species: M. beccarii

Binomial name
- Musa beccarii N.W. Simmonds

Subspecies
- See text

= Musa beccarii =

Species of flowering plant

Musa beccarii is a species of wild banana (genus Musa), found in Malaysia, in Sabah (in the northern part of the island of Borneo). It is placed in section Callimusa (now including the former section Australimusa).

== Description ==
Musa beccarii is a stoloniferous plant growing up to 1.2 metres (3 ft 11 in) tall, with up to 12 suckers. The flower bud is narrow, bright scarlet with green-tipped bracts. The fruit is green and thin.

== Habitat ==
Musa beccarii grows in damp places at edge of Borneo lowland rain forests and grass fields, up to 49 metres (161 ft) elevation.

== Taxonomy ==
The species is named after Italian naturalist Odoardo Beccari.

It includes two subspecies, Musa beccarii subsp. beccarii (the autonym) and Musa beccarii subsp. hottana Häkkinen. Häkkinen et al., 2007 use Inter-Retrotransposon Amplified Polymorphism (IRAP) markers to measure genetic distance between the subspecies. They recommend separation as Musa beccarii and Musa hottana.
