= Acanthopelma =

Scientific classification
- Kingdom: Animalia
- Phylum: Arthropoda
- Subphylum: Chelicerata
- Class: Arachnida
- Order: Araneae
- Infraorder: Mygalomorphae
- Family: Theraphosidae
- Genus: Acanthopelma; F. O. Pickard-Cambridge, 1897

Type species
- A. rufescens F. O. Pickard-Cambridge, 1897

Species
- A. beccarii Caporiacco, 1947 – Guyana; A. rufescens F. O. Pickard-Cambridge, 1897 – Central America

Genus of spiders

Acanthopelma is a genus of tarantulas that was first described by Frederick Octavius Pickard-Cambridge in 1897. As of December 2019 it contains two species, found in Central America and South America: A. beccarii and A. rufescens. This genus was established following the discovery of a specimen of A. rufescens, a single male collected in Guatemala.
