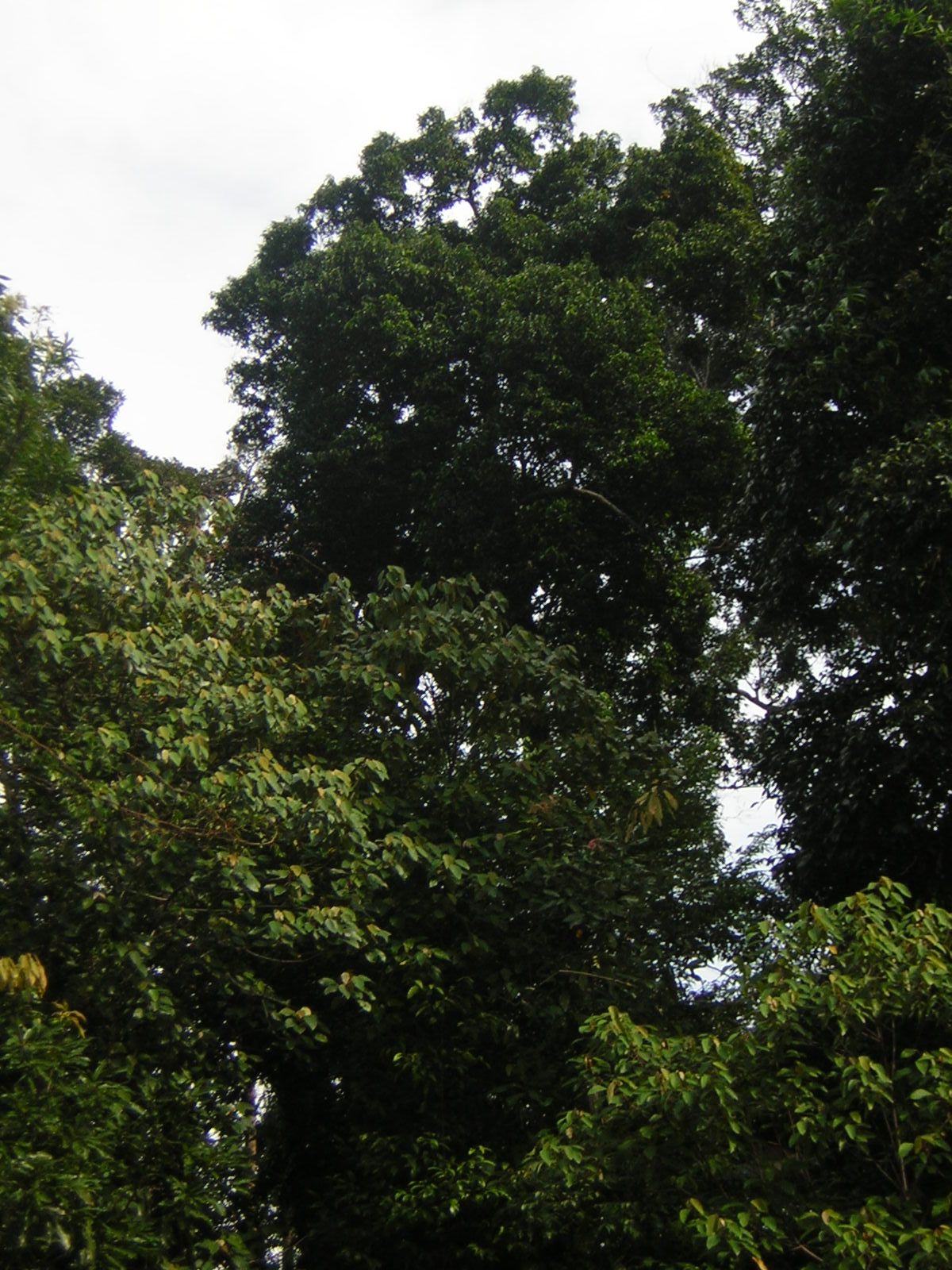
- P. Mezzettia

Scientific classification
- Kingdom: Plantae
- Clade: Tracheophytes
- Clade: Angiosperms
- Clade: Magnoliids
- Order: Magnoliales
- Family: Annonaceae
- Subfamily: Ambavioideae
- Genus: Mezzettia; Becc.

= Mezzettia =

Genus of plants

Mezzettia is a genus of plant in family Annonaceae. It contains the following species, according to The Plant List (which list may be incomplete):

- Mezzettia havilandii (Boerl.) Ridl.
- Mezzettia macrocarpa Heyden & Kessler
- Mezzettia parviflora Becc.
- Mezzettia umbellata Becc.
