= Bulbophyllum singaporeanum =

Scientific classification
- Kingdom: Plantae
- Clade: Tracheophytes
- Clade: Angiosperms
- Clade: Monocots
- Order: Asparagales
- Family: Orchidaceae
- Subfamily: Epidendroideae
- Genus: Bulbophyllum
- Species: B. singaporeanum

Binomial name
- Bulbophyllum singaporeanum Schltr.

Species of orchid

Bulbophyllum singaporeanum is a species of orchid in the genus Bulbophyllum. This species has leaves that are about 30 cm long and 4 cm wide, glossy green on top and slightly purple below. The inflorescence bears a cluster of small flowers. They are a pale purplish-green, with dark purple spotsand a magenta coloured lip. They emit an unpleasant odour of rotting fish or the smell of anchovies which leads to believe that they are pollinated by flies. The first specimen was collected in Singapore in 1889 and they are native to Borneo and Malaysia.
