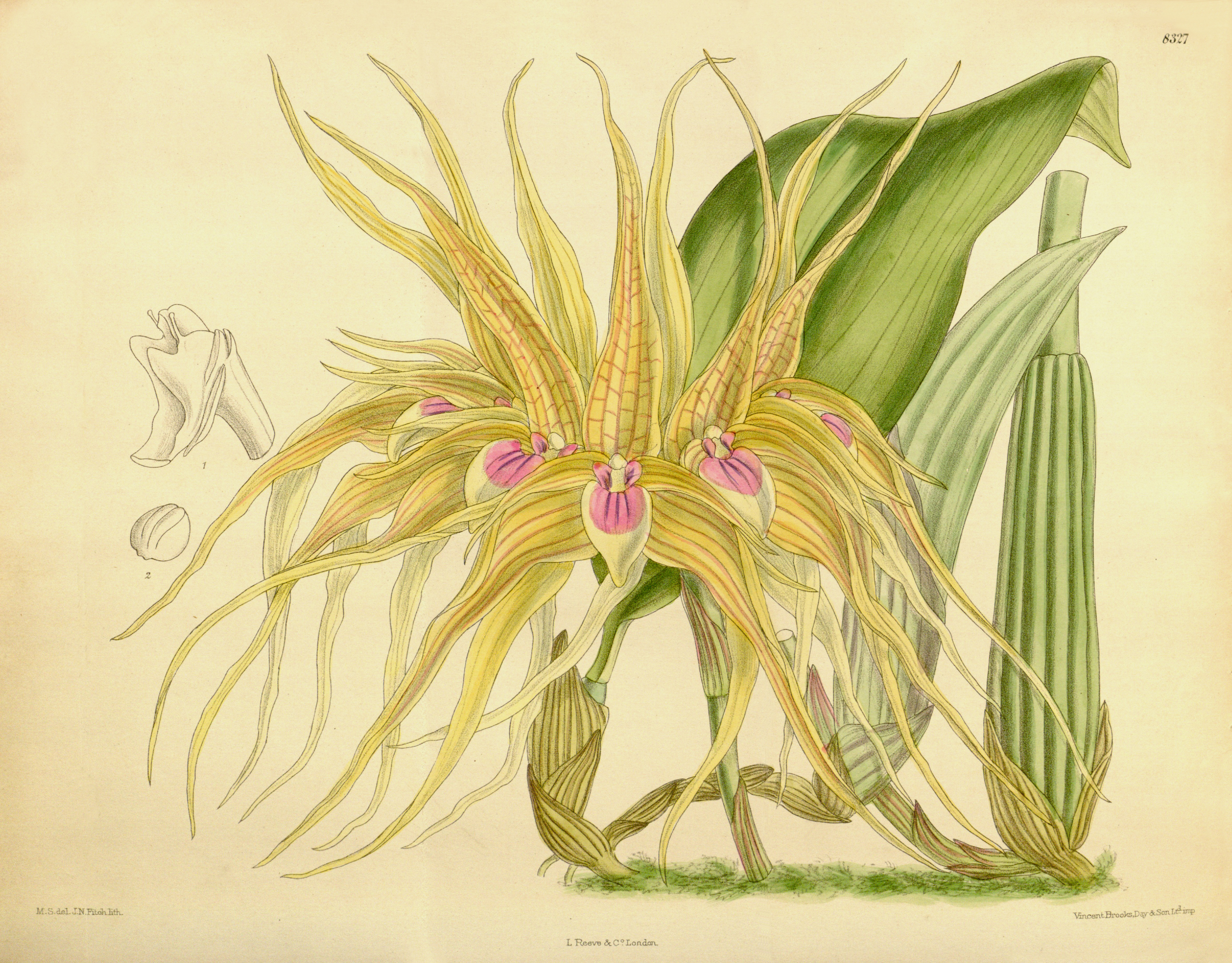

Scientific classification
- Kingdom: Plantae
- Clade: Tracheophytes
- Clade: Angiosperms
- Clade: Monocots
- Order: Asparagales
- Family: Orchidaceae
- Subfamily: Epidendroideae
- Genus: Bulbophyllum
- Species: B. pahudii

Binomial name
- Bulbophyllum pahudii (de Vriese) Rchb. f.

Synonyms
- Ephippium capitatum Blume (1825); Cirrhopetalum capitatum (Blume) Lindl. (1843); Cirrhopetalum pahudii de Vriese (1854); Cirrhopetalum carinatum Teijsm. & Binn. (1855); Bulbophyllum javanicum Miq. (1859); Cirrhopetalum flagelliforme Teijsm. & Binn. ex Rchb. (1861); Bulbophyllum virescens J.J.Sm. (1900)

= Bulbophyllum pahudii =

Species of orchid

Bulbophyllum pahudii is a species of orchid in the genus Bulbophyllum. It can be found in Java, at a minimum elevation of 850 meters and is very rare. It was first discovered in 1883. This species of orchid has a very bad smell but is very beautiful. Bulbophyllum pahudii flowers are over 4" tall.
