= Acanthopelma beccarii =

Scientific classification
- Kingdom: Animalia
- Phylum: Arthropoda
- Subphylum: Chelicerata
- Class: Arachnida
- Order: Araneae
- Infraorder: Mygalomorphae
- Family: Theraphosidae
- Genus: Acanthopelma
- Species: A. beccarii

Binomial name
- Acanthopelma beccarii Caporiacco, 1947

Species of spider

Acanthopelma beccarii is a species of spider belonging to the family Theraphosidae (tarantulas). It is endemic to Guyana in northern South America.

While there are specimens held in captivity, it is not a very popular species in this regard.
