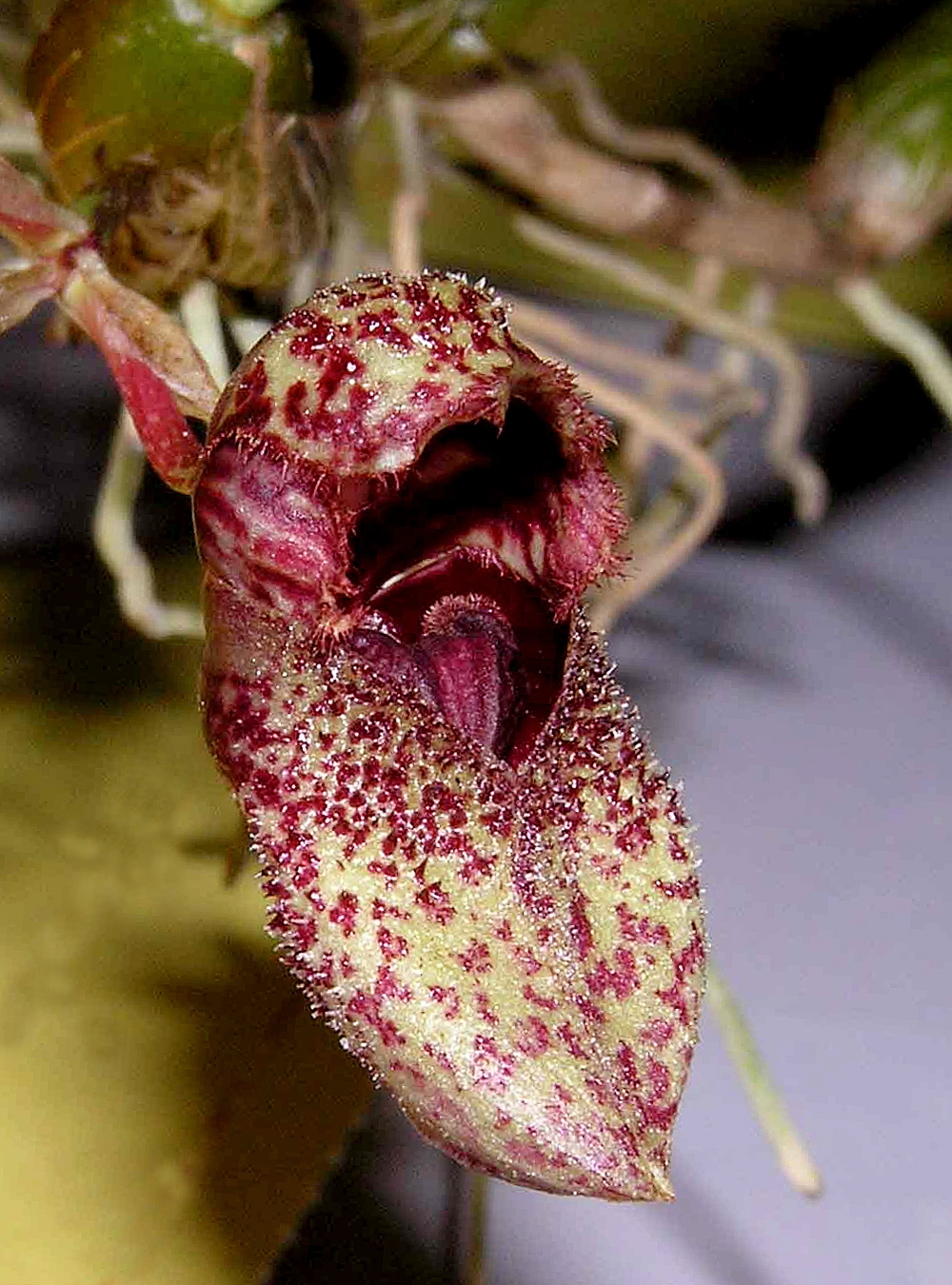

Scientific classification
- Kingdom: Plantae
- Clade: Tracheophytes
- Clade: Angiosperms
- Clade: Monocots
- Order: Asparagales
- Family: Orchidaceae
- Subfamily: Epidendroideae
- Genus: Bulbophyllum
- Species: B. agastor

Binomial name
- Bulbophyllum agastor Garay, Hamer & Siegerist

= Bulbophyllum agastor =

Species of orchid

Bulbophyllum agastor is a species of flowering plant in the family Orchidaceae.
