= Bulbophyllum striatum =

Scientific classification
- Kingdom: Plantae
- Clade: Tracheophytes
- Clade: Angiosperms
- Clade: Monocots
- Order: Asparagales
- Family: Orchidaceae
- Subfamily: Epidendroideae
- Genus: Bulbophyllum
- Species: B. striatum

Binomial name
- Bulbophyllum striatum (Griff.) Rchb.f.

Synonyms
- Dendrobium striatum Griff.; Phyllorkis striata (Griff.) Kuntze; Sarcopodium striatum (Griff.) Lindl.; Bulbophyllum striatitepalum Seidenf.

Species of orchid

Bulbophyllum striatum is a species of flowering plant in the family Orchidaceae.
