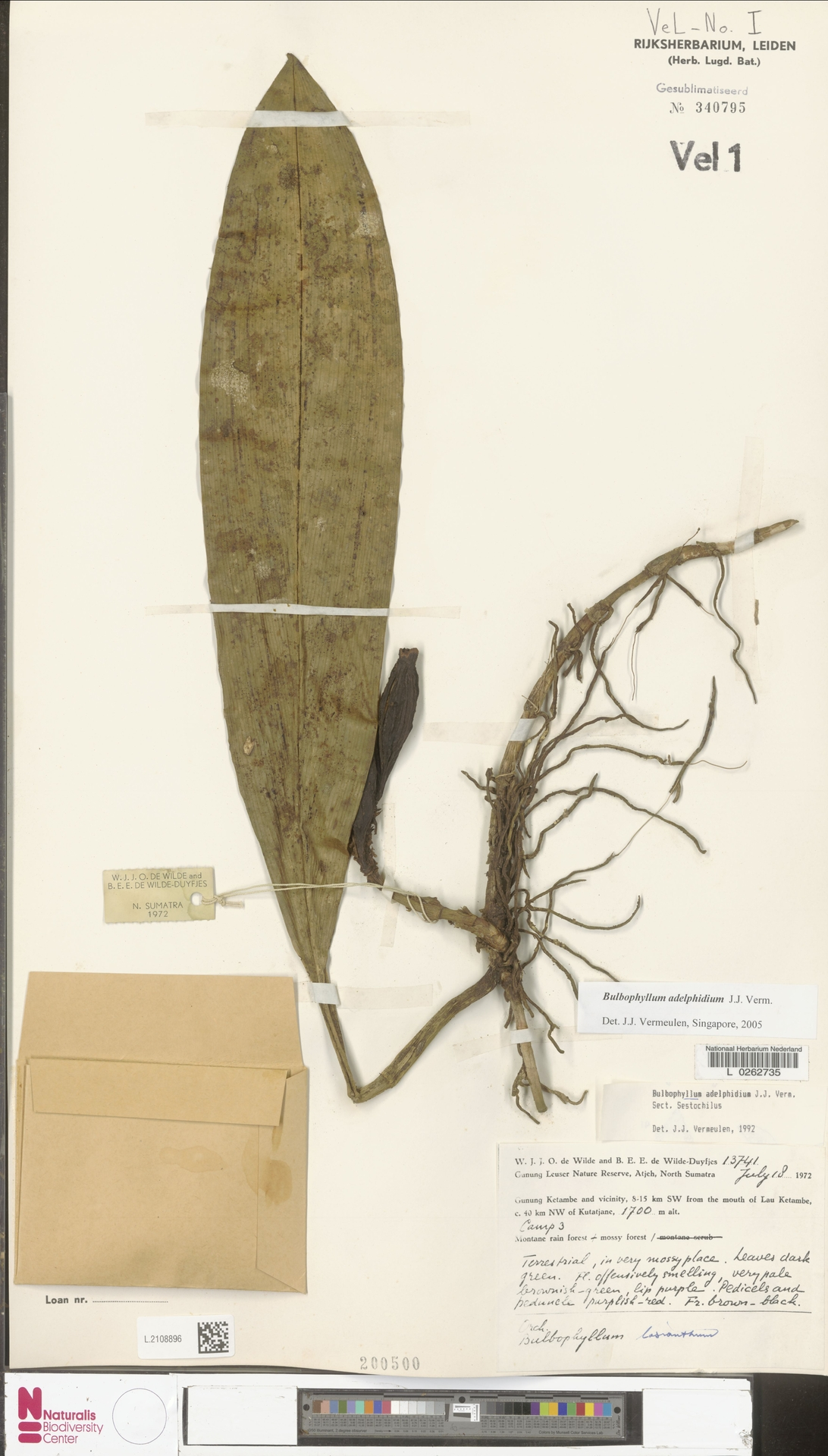

Scientific classification
- Kingdom: Plantae
- Clade: Tracheophytes
- Clade: Angiosperms
- Clade: Monocots
- Order: Asparagales
- Family: Orchidaceae
- Subfamily: Epidendroideae
- Genus: Bulbophyllum
- Species: B. adelphidium

Binomial name
- Bulbophyllum adelphidium J.J.Verm.

= Bulbophyllum adelphidium =

Species of orchid

Bulbophyllum adelphidium is a species of orchid in the genus Bulbophyllum. The species was originally described by J.J. Vermeulen i 1993
