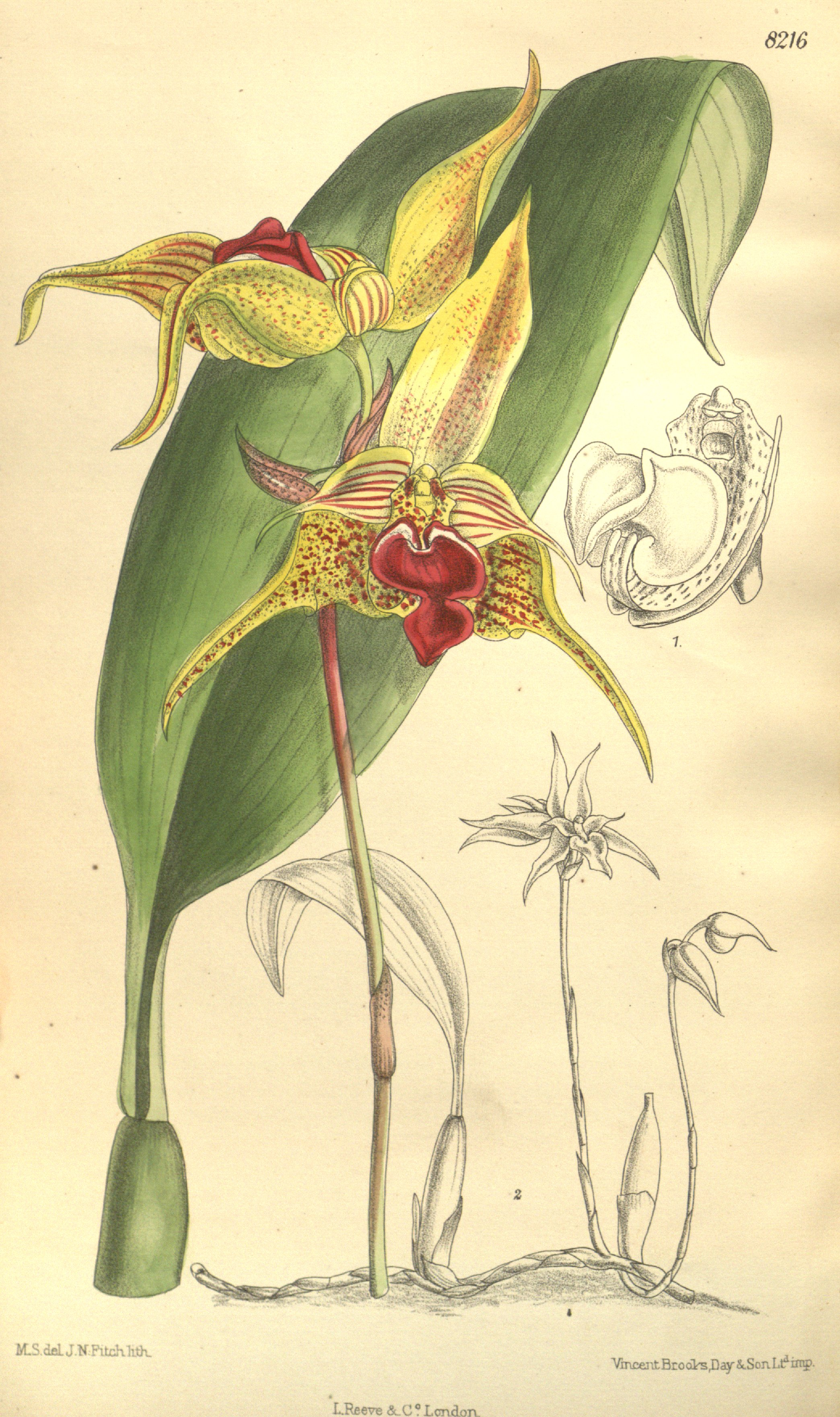

Scientific classification
- Kingdom: Plantae
- Clade: Tracheophytes
- Clade: Angiosperms
- Clade: Monocots
- Order: Asparagales
- Family: Orchidaceae
- Subfamily: Epidendroideae
- Genus: Bulbophyllum
- Species: B. uniflorum

Binomial name
- Bulbophyllum uniflorum (Blume) Hassk.

Synonyms
- Ephippium uniflorum Blume (1825); Cirrhopetalum compressum Lindl. (1843); Dendrobium grandiflorum Reinw. ex Lindl. (1853); Sarcopodium reinwardtii Lindl. (1853); Bulbophyllum reinwardtii (Lindl.) Rchb.f. (1861); Phyllorkis uniflora (Blume) Kuntze (1891); Phyllorkis reinwardtii (Lindl.) Kuntze (1891); Bulbophyllum galbinum Ridl. (1897); Bulbophyllum hewittii Ridl. (1910)

= Bulbophyllum uniflorum =

Species of orchid

Bulbophyllum uniflorum is a species of orchid in the genus Bulbophyllum.
