= Scopula beccarii =

Scientific classification
- Kingdom: Animalia
- Phylum: Arthropoda
- Clade: Pancrustacea
- Class: Insecta
- Order: Lepidoptera
- Family: Geometridae
- Genus: Scopula
- Species: S. beccarii

Binomial name
- Scopula beccarii (Prout, 1915)

Synonyms
- Acidalia beccarii Prout, 1915

Species of geometer moth in subfamily Sterrhinae

Scopula beccarii is a moth of the family Geometridae. It was described by Prout in 1915. It is endemic to Eritrea.
