= Beccarianthus =

Scientific classification
- Kingdom: Plantae
- Clade: Tracheophytes
- Clade: Angiosperms
- Clade: Eudicots
- Clade: Rosids
- Order: Myrtales
- Family: Melastomataceae
- Genus: Beccarianthus; Cogn.

Genus of flowering plants

Beccarianthus is a genus of flowering plants belonging to the family Melastomataceae.

Its native range is Borneo to Philippines, New Guinea.

Species:

- Beccarianthus acutifolius (Mansf.) J.F.Maxwell
- Beccarianthus ickisii Merr.
- Beccarianthus insignis (K.Schum. & Lauterb.) J.F.Maxwell
- Beccarianthus octodontus (Merr.) J.F.Maxwell
- Beccarianthus puberulus (Merr.) J.F.Maxwell
- Beccarianthus pulcher Cogn.
- Beccarianthus pulcherrimus (Merr.) J.F.Maxwell
- Beccarianthus robustus Nayar
- Beccarianthus rufolanatus J.F.Maxwell
