= Bulbophyllum stictosepalum =

Scientific classification
- Kingdom: Plantae
- Clade: Tracheophytes
- Clade: Angiosperms
- Clade: Monocots
- Order: Asparagales
- Family: Orchidaceae
- Subfamily: Epidendroideae
- Genus: Bulbophyllum
- Species: B. stictosepalum

Binomial name
- Bulbophyllum stictosepalum Schltr.

Species of orchid

Bulbophyllum stictosepalum is a species of orchid in the genus Bulbophyllum.

This pseudobulbous epiphyte species is native to Papua New Guinea, and has adapted to its wet tropical conditions.
