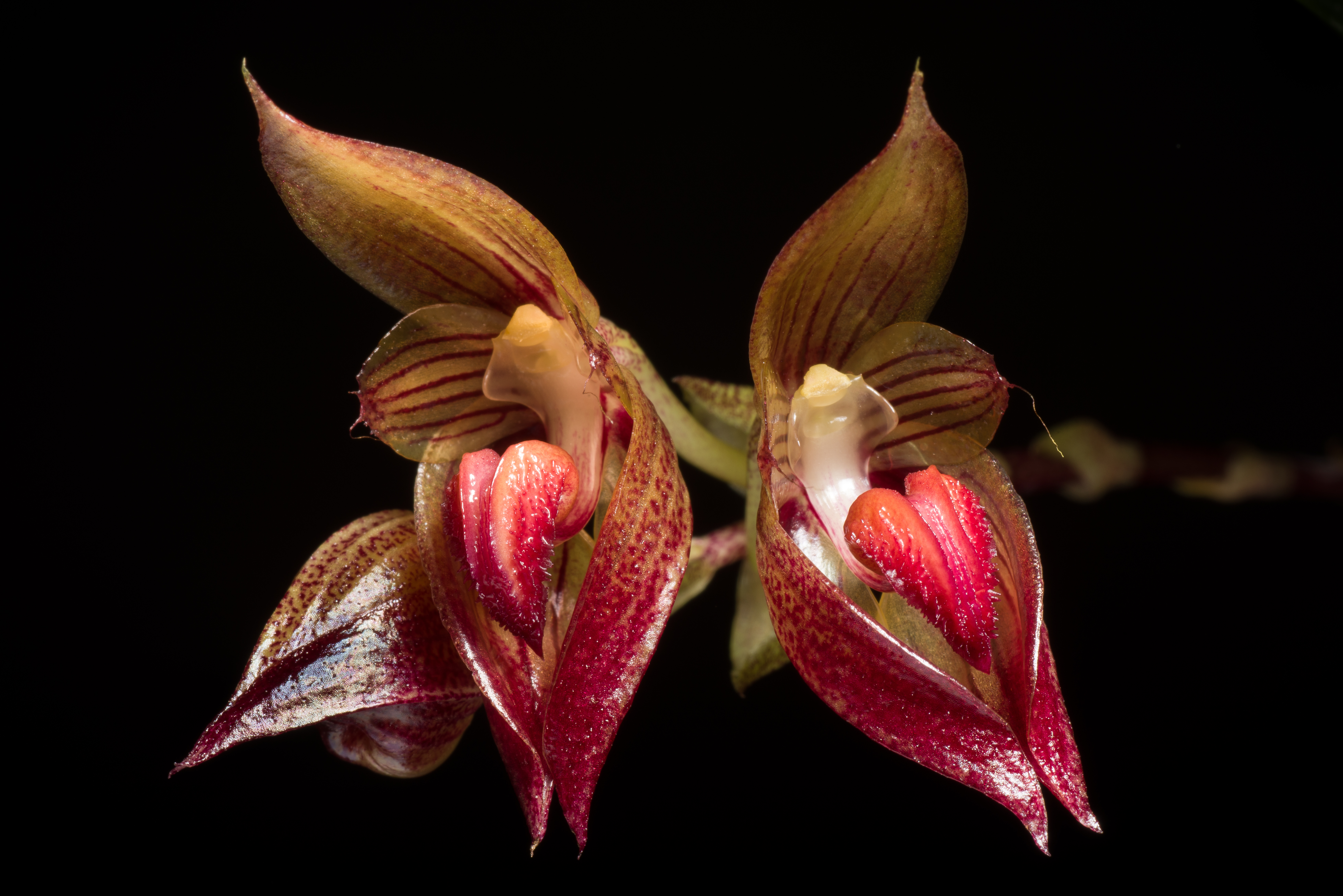

Scientific classification
- Kingdom: Plantae
- Clade: Tracheophytes
- Clade: Angiosperms
- Clade: Monocots
- Order: Asparagales
- Family: Orchidaceae
- Subfamily: Epidendroideae
- Genus: Bulbophyllum
- Species: B. subumbellatum

Binomial name
- Bulbophyllum subumbellatum Ridl.

= Bulbophyllum subumbellatum =

Species of orchid

Bulbophyllum subumbellatum is a species of orchid in the genus Bulbophyllum.

Can be found in Peninsular Malaysia and Borneo in lowland swamp forests on tree trunks and branches at elevations.
