= Bulbophyllum rugosum =

Scientific classification
- Kingdom: Plantae
- Clade: Tracheophytes
- Clade: Angiosperms
- Clade: Monocots
- Order: Asparagales
- Family: Orchidaceae
- Subfamily: Epidendroideae
- Genus: Bulbophyllum
- Species: B. rugosum

Binomial name
- Bulbophyllum rugosum Ridl.

Synonyms
- Bulbophyllum dagamense Ames 1915; Bulbophyllum melliferum J.J.Sm. 1912

Species of orchid

Bulbophyllum rugosum is a species of orchid in the genus Bulbophyllum.
