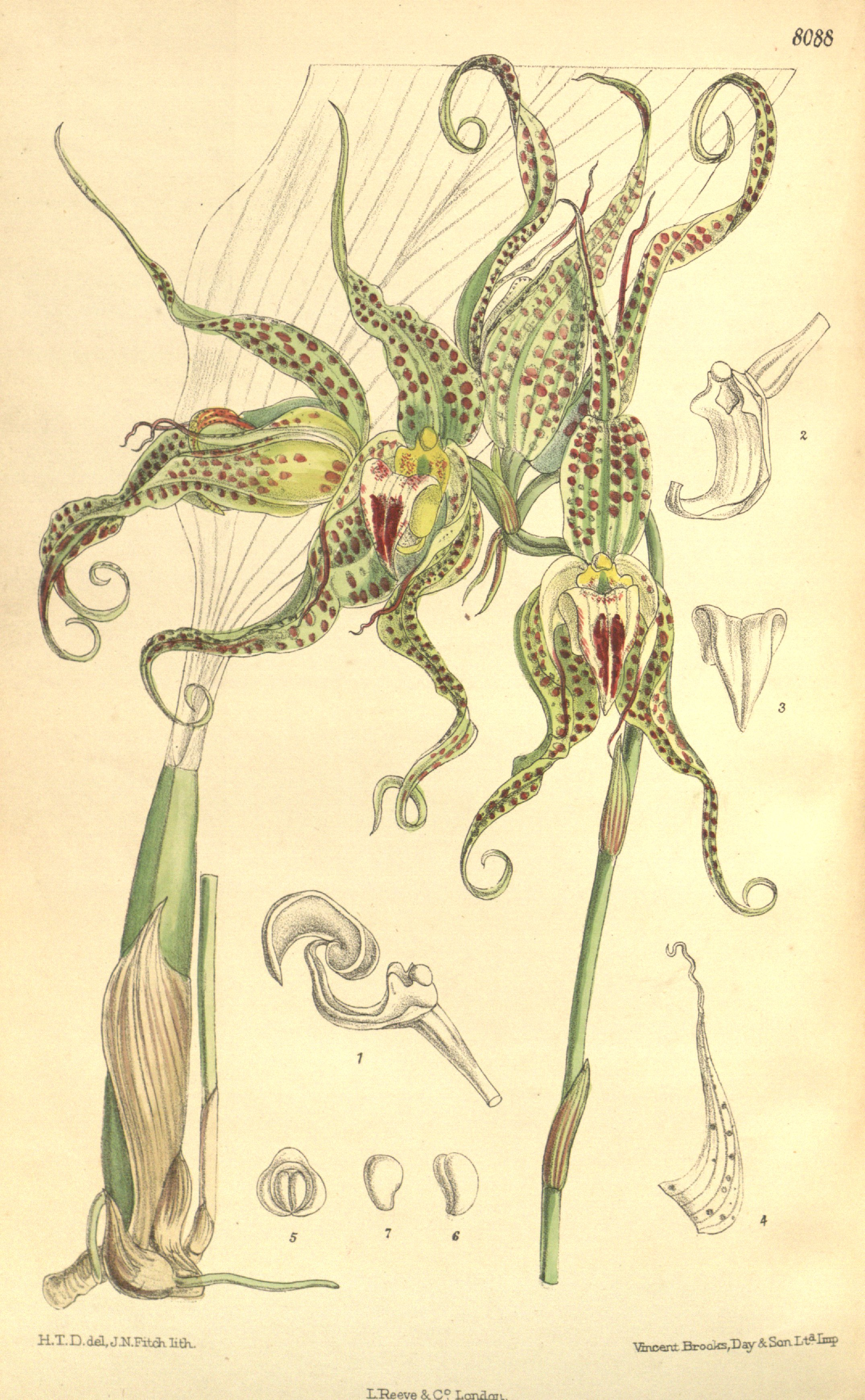
- Illustration from Curtis's Botanical Magazine

Scientific classification
- Kingdom: Plantae
- Clade: Tracheophytes
- Clade: Angiosperms
- Clade: Monocots
- Order: Asparagales
- Family: Orchidaceae
- Subfamily: Epidendroideae
- Genus: Bulbophyllum
- Species: B. ericssonii

Binomial name
- Bulbophyllum ericssonii Kraenzl.

Synonyms
- Bulbophyllum binnendijkii J.J.Sm. 1905; Bulbophyllum virescens J.J. Sm. 1900; Cirrhopetalum leopardinum Teijsm. & Binn. 1862; Bulbophyllum maximum (Ridl.) Ridl. 1907; Bulbophyllum ridleyanum Garay, Hamer & Siegerist 1994; Cirrhopetalum maximum Ridl. 1900

= Bulbophyllum ericssonii =

Bulbophyllum ericsonii

Species of orchid

Bulbophyllum ericssonii is a species of orchid in the genus Bulbophyllum that grows from Malesia to New Guinea.
