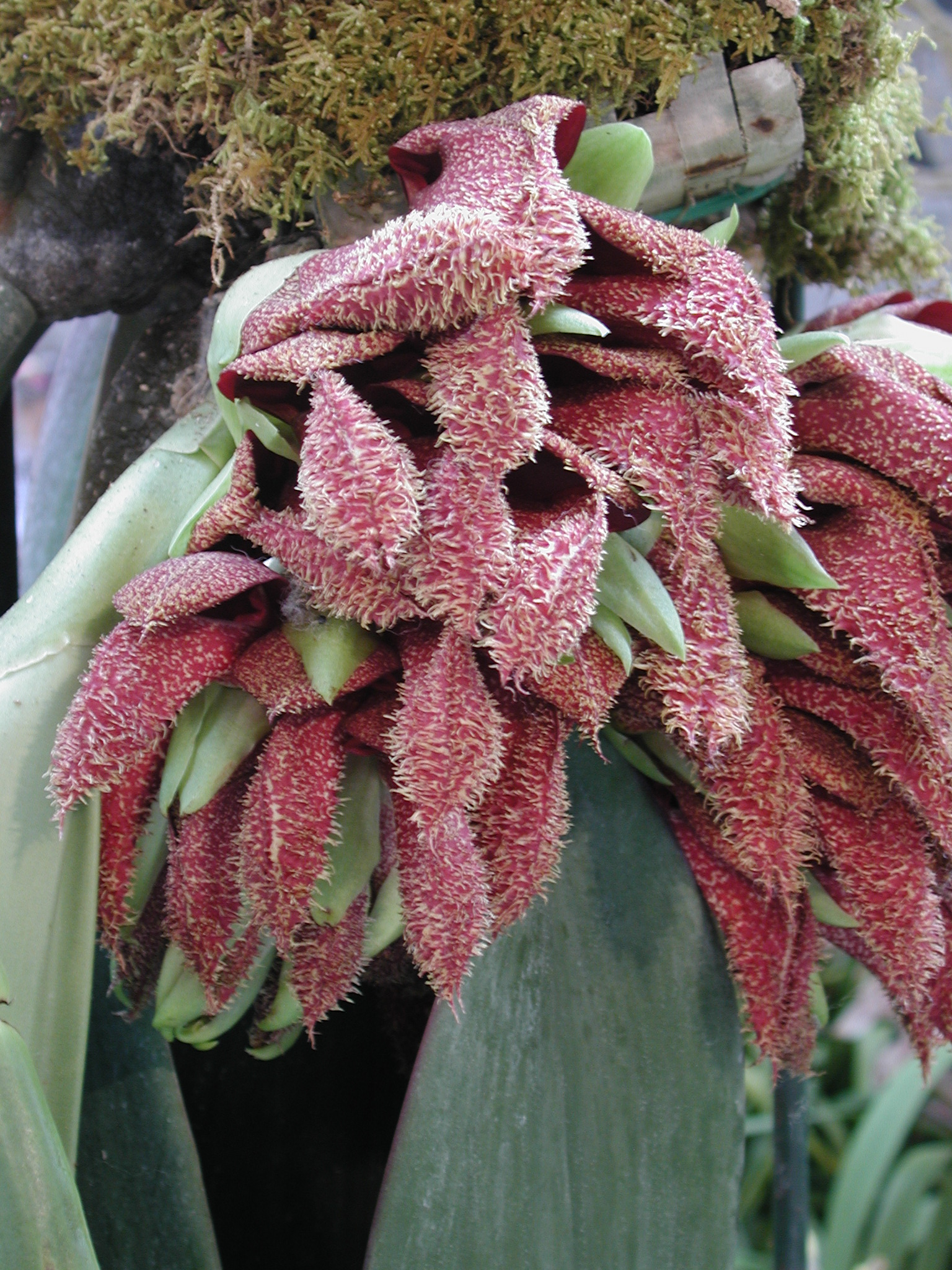

Scientific classification
- Kingdom: Plantae
- Clade: Tracheophytes
- Clade: Angiosperms
- Clade: Monocots
- Order: Asparagales
- Family: Orchidaceae
- Subfamily: Epidendroideae
- Genus: Bulbophyllum
- Species: B. phalaenopsis

Binomial name
- Bulbophyllum phalaenopsis J. J. Sm.

Synonyms
- Bulbophyllum giganteum Hort., Amer. Orchid Soc. 1971

= Bulbophyllum phalaenopsis =

Species of orchid

Bulbophyllum phalaenopsis is a species of orchid in the genus Bulbophyllum.

== Description ==
Bulbophyllum phalaenopsis grows as an epiphyte with clusters of 6-4 cm pseudobulbs each growing a single large pendant, broad, succulent, leaves 120 to 180 cm long and narrow at the base. Plants bloom on a short scape next to the pseudobulb with 12-20 flowers that are 6 cm long reddish brown and covered in brown hairs. Flowers contain elliptical bracts that are 4 x 7 cm.

== Distribution ==
Plants are found growing in dark moist lowland forest of New Guinea at elevations below 500 meters. Its flowers' fragrance is that of rotting meat that attracts flies which pollinate them.
