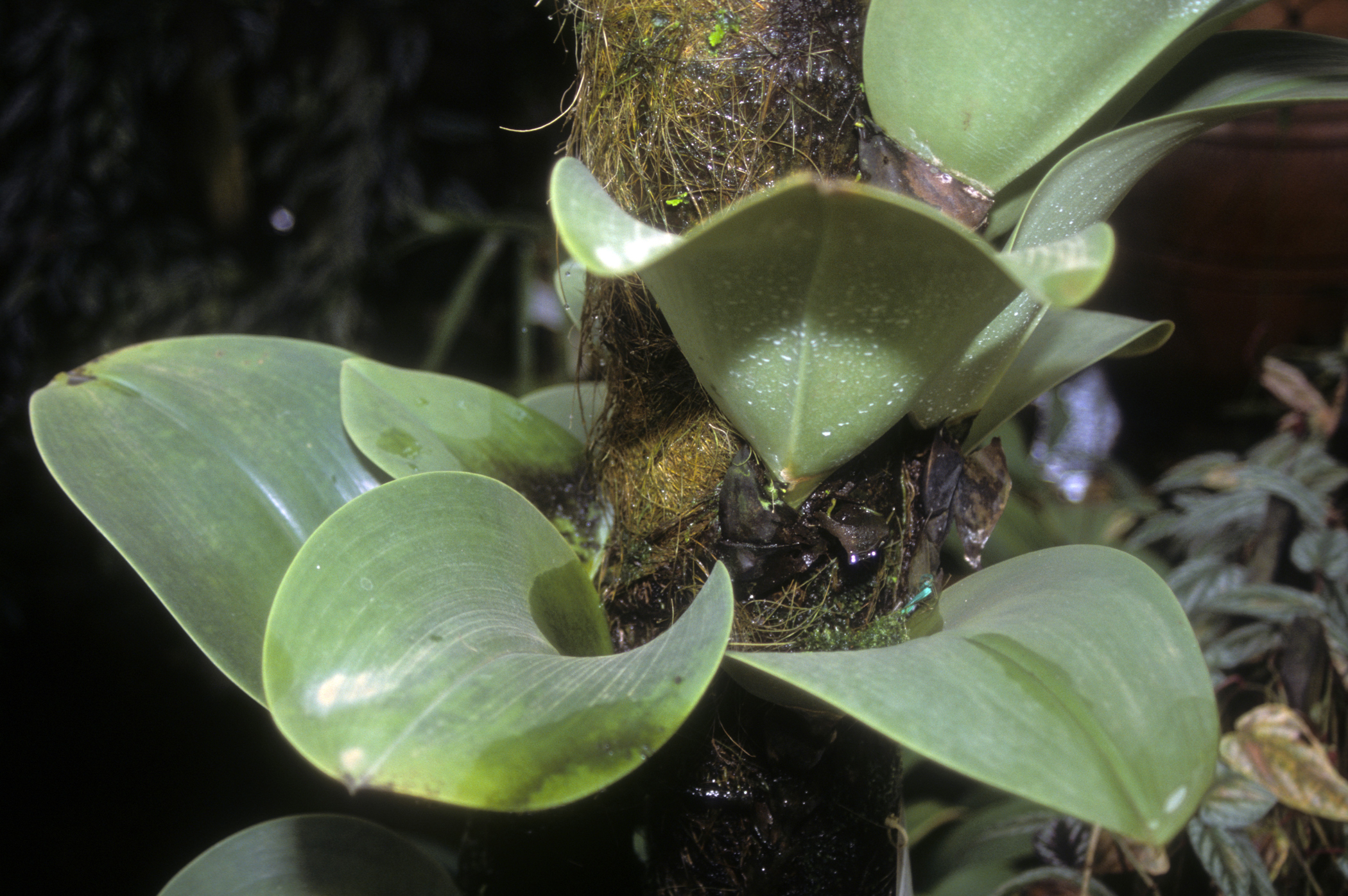

Conservation status
- CITES Appendix II

Scientific classification
- Kingdom: Plantae
- Clade: Embryophytes
- Clade: Tracheophytes
- Clade: Spermatophytes
- Clade: Angiosperms
- Clade: Monocots
- Order: Asparagales
- Family: Orchidaceae
- Subfamily: Epidendroideae
- Genus: Bulbophyllum
- Species: B. beccarii

Binomial name
- Bulbophyllum beccarii Rchb.f.

Synonyms
- Phyllorkis beccarii (Rchb.f.) Kuntze

= Bulbophyllum beccarii =

Species of orchid from Borneo

Bulbophyllum beccarii is by far the largest species in the genus Bulbophyllum and one of the largest in the orchid family, perhaps second only to Grammatophyllum speciosum.

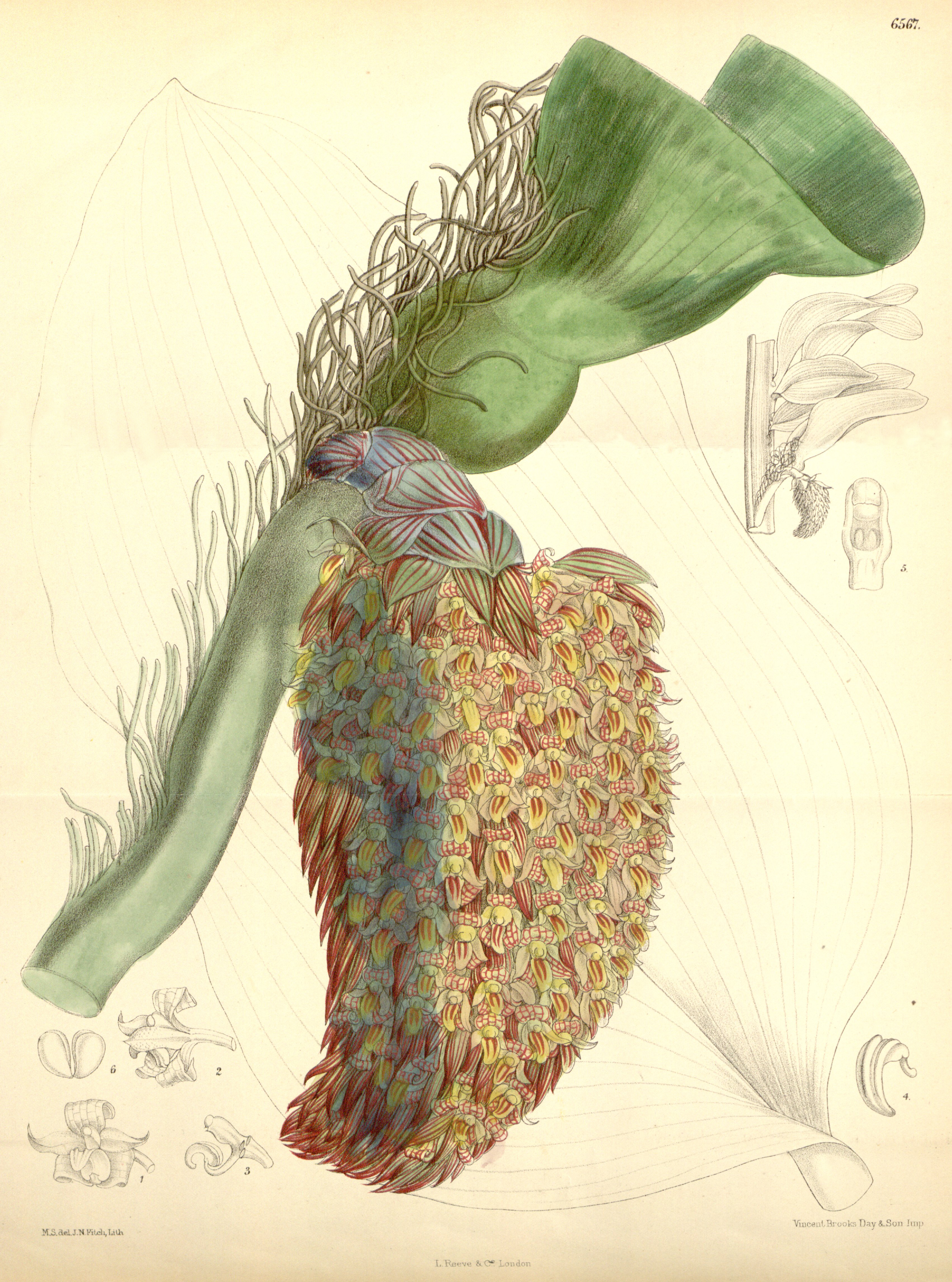
Illustration showing the inflorescence of Bulbophyllum beccarii.

The thick rhizome, reportedly up to 20 cm in diameter (but the thickest reliably reported has been 5 cm) snakes its way around tree trunks climbing up into the light. Exact length figures are not available, but its discoverer, Odoardo Beccari, reported that it climbed "to a great height". Along its length at intervals are the relatively small egg shaped pseudobulbs each with a huge thick, leathery leaf at their apex. They are up to 60 cm long and 20 cm wide, yellowish-green and point vertically. The huge bowl shaped leaves are designed to catch falling debris and turn it into fertilizers. The inflorescence is produced from the rhizome near one of the pseudobulbs and hangs downwards to about 20–22 cm and is composed of hundreds of small yellowish flowers netted with red that smell like rotting meat to attract various flies. It grows in the rainforests of Borneo.
