= Hoya mariae =

Scientific classification
- Kingdom: Plantae
- Clade: Embryophytes
- Clade: Tracheophytes
- Clade: Angiosperms
- Clade: Eudicots
- Clade: Asterids
- Order: Gentianales
- Family: Apocynaceae
- Genus: Hoya
- Species: H. mariae

Binomial name
- Hoya mariae (Schltr.) L.Wanntorp & Meve

Synonyms
- Clemensia mariae Schltr. (genus name is illegitimate); Clemensiella mariae (Schltr.) Schltr.; Clemensiella viracensis (Kloppenb. & Siar) Kloppenb.; Hoya viracensis Kloppenb. & Siar

Species of flowering plant

Hoya mariae, synonym Clemensiella mariae, is a species of plants in the family Apocynaceae, native to the Philippines. It was first described in 1915.

== Taxonomy ==
The species was first described by Rudolf Schlechter in 1915 as Clemensia mariae along with his new genus Clemensia. The names honoured Mary Strong Clemens and her husband Joseph. However, the genus name turned out to be an illegitimate homonym (in other words, someone else had already used the name for a different plant), so Schlechter published the name Clemensiella for genus, making the species Clemensiella mariae. A 2011 molecular phylogenetic study showed that Clemensiella was embedded within Hoya, and Clemensiella mariae was transferred to Hoya as Hoya mariae.
