= Hoya clemensiorum =

Scientific classification
- Kingdom: Plantae
- Clade: Tracheophytes
- Clade: Angiosperms
- Clade: Eudicots
- Clade: Asterids
- Order: Gentianales
- Family: Apocynaceae
- Genus: Hoya
- Species: H. clemensiorum

Binomial name
- Hoya clemensiorum T.Green

Species of plant

Hoya clemensiorum is a species of flowering plant in the dogbane family Apocynaceae, native to the island of Borneo.

== Description ==
Hoya clemensiorum is an evergreen climbing vine that grows as an epiphyte on trees or lithophyte on rocky substrate. The leaves are thick, rigid, and leathery (coriaceous), measuring 15-35 cm (rarely up to 40 cm) in length and 6-10 cm in width. The leaf blade features prominent, dark brownish-green or dark purple reticulate and pinnate venation that forms a striking contrasting pattern against a lighter olive-green background, with a paler underside and raised veins.

The inflorescence is a hanging (geotropic) umbel bearing 20-40 flowers on a persistent peduncle. The corolla lobes are strongly reflexed, measuring about 1.2-1.5 cm across, colored dull ochre, yellowish brown, or olive-tan, and densely pubescent on the inner surface. The central corona is ivory to creamy white, often tinted with pink or reddish purple. The flowers produce nectar and emit a citrus or spicy fragrance, typically lasting 4-6 days.

== Distribution and habitat ==
The species is endemic to Borneo, recorded from Sabah and Sarawak in Malaysia, as well as Brunei and Kalimantan in Indonesia. It inhabits lowland to lower montane primary rainforests and riverine forest edges, climbing tree trunks from near sea level up to approximately 1,500 m elevation on Mount Kinabalu.

== Taxonomy ==
The species was described by Ted Green in 2001 in the journal Fraterna. It was initially published under the name Hoya clemensii. In the subsequent issue of the journal, Green published a formal nomenclatural correction amending the specific epithet to clemensiorum to apply the plural genitive ending (-iorum), explicitly honoring both Mary Strong Clemens and her husband Joseph Clemens.

=== Typification ===
The original holotype designated by Green (Green 91032), collected in Sabah and deposited at the Bernice P. Bishop Museum (BISH) in Honolulu, could not be located in the museum's herbarium. In 2017, botanist Michele Rodda designated a neotype to stabilize the application of the name, selecting an archival specimen collected by Joseph and Mary Strong Clemens on 8 September 1931 at Tenompok on Mount Kinabalu (Clemens & Clemens 26358). The neotype is preserved at the herbarium of the Royal Botanic Gardens, Kew (K000894877), with isoneotypes at the BM, BO, and L.

=== Etymology ===
The specific epithet clemensiorum is a botanical Latin genitive plural honorific commemorating the American botanical collecting team of Mary Strong Clemens (1873-1968) and Joseph Clemens (1862-1936), recognizing their prolific joint botanical collecting across China, the Philippines, Borneo, and New Guinea.

== See also ==
- List of Hoya species
- Mary Strong Clemens
