= Marsypopetalum lucidum =

Scientific classification
- Kingdom: Plantae
- Clade: Tracheophytes
- Clade: Angiosperms
- Clade: Magnoliids
- Order: Magnoliales
- Family: Annonaceae
- Genus: Marsypopetalum
- Species: M. lucidum

Binomial name
- Marsypopetalum lucidum (Merr.) B.Xue & R.M.K.Saunders

Synonyms
- Polyalthia lucida Merr.

Species of flowering plant

Marsypopetalum lucidum is a species of plants in the custard apple family Annonaceae native to the Philippines.
