= Melicope sororia =

Conservation status
- Vulnerable (IUCN 3.1)

Scientific classification
- Kingdom: Plantae
- Clade: Tracheophytes
- Clade: Angiosperms
- Clade: Eudicots
- Clade: Rosids
- Order: Sapindales
- Family: Rutaceae
- Genus: Melicope
- Species: M. sororia

Binomial name
- Melicope sororia T. G. Hartley

Species of flowering plant

Melicope sororia is a species of plant in the family Rutaceae. It is endemic to Borneo where it is confined to Sabah. It is restricted to the Crocker Range, where it is found in Mount Kinabalu and Mount Alab. It grows in lower montane forests from 1500 to 2400 meters elevation.

== Description ==
M. sororia is a shrub or small tree up to 5 meters tall. The leaves are usually uni- and/or trifoliolates measuring up to 25 centimetres (9.8 in), with occasional but rare difoliolate leaves. Its inflorescences are axillary, glabrous or with sparsely puberulent pedicles, consisting of few or many flowers. The petals are white, greenish, or cream-colored. Its pollen has an average polar length of 18 μm, a subspheroidal shape and rugulate sculpture, with a tricolporate aperture. The fruiting carpels measuring 10–13 mm are glabrous throughout, with ellipsoid seeds measuring 9–10 mm long. M. sororia very closely resembles M. jugosa, with distinguishing features include a puberulent or sparse terminal bud, in addition to its petiolule length, and size of petals.

== Taxonomy ==
M. sororia was first described by T. G. Hartley in 1994, together with two other new species from Borneo, M. clemensiae and M. jugosa, with the latter being very closely resembling M. sororia, hence its epithet, derived from Latin sororium, meaning "sisterly", in comparison with M. jugosa.

== Phylogeny ==
The lineage of M. sororia was estimated to be migrated out within a Melicope–Pelea clade from Austroasia into Malesia during the Late or Middle Miocene period.
