= Diospyros clementium =

Scientific classification
- Kingdom: Plantae
- Clade: Tracheophytes
- Clade: Angiosperms
- Clade: Eudicots
- Clade: Asterids
- Order: Ericales
- Family: Ebenaceae
- Genus: Diospyros
- Species: D. clementium

Binomial name
- Diospyros clementium Bakh.

Species of tree

Diospyros clementium is a tree in the family Ebenaceae. It grows up to 9 metres (30 ft) tall. The fruits are ellipsoid, up to 0.8 cm (0.3 in) in diameter. The tree is named for American husband-and-wife plant collectors Joseph Clemens and Mary Strong Clemens. Habitat is mixed dipterocarp forests from sea level to 700 metres (2,300 ft) altitude. D. clementium is endemic to Borneo.
