= Pseuduvaria fragrans =

Conservation status
- Vulnerable (IUCN 3.1)

Scientific classification
- Kingdom: Plantae
- Clade: Embryophytes
- Clade: Tracheophytes
- Clade: Spermatophytes
- Clade: Angiosperms
- Clade: Magnoliids
- Order: Magnoliales
- Family: Annonaceae
- Genus: Pseuduvaria
- Species: P. fragrans

Binomial name
- Pseuduvaria fragrans Y.C.F.Su, Chaowasku & R.M.K.Saunders

Species of plant in the soursop family

Pseuduvaria fragrans is a species of flowering plant in the family Annonaceae. It is a tree native to Peninsular Thailand. Yvonne Su, Tanawat Chaowasku and Richard Saunders the botanists who first formally described the species, named it after its strongly fragrant (fragrans, in Latin) flowers.

== Description ==
It is a tree reaching 4 meters (13 ft) in height. Its elliptical, papery to moderately leathery leaves are 8.5–15.5 by 2.5–6 centimeters. The leaves have pointed to blunt bases and tapering tips, with the tapering portion 9–18 millimeters long. The leaves are hairless on their upper and lower surfaces. The leaves have 8–14 pairs of secondary veins emanating from their midribs. Its hairless to slightly hairy petioles are 4–7 by 0.8–1.9 millimeters with a narrow groove on their upper side. Its Inflorescences are solitary and are organized on peduncles that are 3.5–8 by 0.5 millimeters. Each inflorescence has up to 7 flowers. Each flower is on a sparsely hairy pedicel that is 3–10 by 0.2 millimeters. The pedicels have a medial, densely hairy bract that is 1 millimeters long. The flowers are unisexual. Its flowers have 3 oval sepals, that are 1–1.3 by 1–1.5 millimeters. The sepals are hairless on their upper surface, and densely hairy on their lower surface and margins. Its 6 petals are arranged in two rows of 3. The cream-colored, oval, outer petals are 3–4 by 3 millimeters with hairless upper surfaces and sparsely hairy lower surfaces. The inner petals are cream-colored with purple highlights on their upper surface. The diamond-shaped, inner petals have a 1.5–2.5 millimeter long claw at their base and a 4.5–5.5 by 3–3.5 millimeter blade. The inner petals have pointed tips and bases. The upper surfaces of the inner petals are densely hairy. The lower surfaces of the inner petals are sparsely hairy. The inner petals have a pair of smooth, round glands on their upper surface. Male flowers have up to 24 stamens that are 0.6 by 0.5 millimeters. Female flowers have up to 3 carpels that are 2.5 by 1 millimeters. Each carpel has 5 ovules arranged in a single row. The fruit occur in clusters of 1–3 on hairless pedicles that are 13 by 1 millimeters. The pale green, mature fruit are elliptical and 25 by 3 millimeters with a tapering tip about 8 millimeters long. The fruit are smooth, and densely hairy.

=== Reproductive biology ===
The pollen of P. fragrans is shed as permanent tetrads.

== Habitat and distribution ==
It has been observed growing in evergreen forests or limestone hills at elevations of 100 to 250 meters (330 to 820 ft).
