= Pseuduvaria mindorensis =

Conservation status
- Endangered (IUCN 3.1)

Scientific classification
- Kingdom: Plantae
- Clade: Embryophytes
- Clade: Tracheophytes
- Clade: Spermatophytes
- Clade: Angiosperms
- Clade: Magnoliids
- Order: Magnoliales
- Family: Annonaceae
- Genus: Pseuduvaria
- Species: P. mindorensis

Binomial name
- Pseuduvaria mindorensis Y.C.F.Su & R.M.K.Saunders

Species of plant in the soursop family

Pseuduvaria mindorensis is a species of plant in the family Annonaceae. It is native to the Philippines. Yvonne Su and Richard Saunders, the botanists who first formally described the species, named it after the island of Mindoro where the specimen they examined was collected in the municipality of Puerto Galera.

== Description ==
It is a small tree reaching 3 meters (9.8 ft) in height. The young, dark brown branches are slightly hairy and have many lenticels. Its elliptical, papery leaves are 11–24 cm (4.3–9.4 in) by 4–9 cm (1.6–3.5 in). The leaves have pointed to wedge-shaped to blunt or rounded bases and pointed to tapering tips, with the tapering portion 10–15 millimeters long. The leaves are hairless on their upper and lower surfaces. The leaves have 12–16 pairs of secondary veins emanating from their midribs. Its sparsely hairy petioles are 6–10 by 1–2.5 millimeters with a broad groove on their upper side. Its Inflorescences occur in groups of 2–4 on branches, and are organized on densely hairy peduncles that are 3–4 by 0.8–0.9 millimeters. Each inflorescence has up to 6 flowers. Each flower is on a densely hairy pedicel that is 9–14 by 0.3–0.5 millimeters. The pedicels are organized on a rachis up to 5 millimeters long that has 3–5 bracts. The pedicels have a medial, densely hairy bract that is 0.9–1.2 millimeters long. Its flowers are unisexual. Its flowers have 3 free, triangular sepals, that are 1–1.5 by 1.5–2 millimeters. The sepals are hairless on their upper surface, densely hairy on their lower surface, and hairy at their margins. Its 6 petals are arranged in two rows of 3. The yellow, oval, outer petals are 2.5–3.5 by 2.5–3 millimeters with hairless upper and very densely hairy lower surfaces. The yellow, diamond-shaped, inner petals have a 3.5–4.5 millimeter long claw at their base and a 6–7 by 2.5–3.5 millimeter blade. The inner petals have pointed bases and tips. The inner petals are hairless on their upper surface, except near the tip where they are hairy. The inner petals have very densely hairy lower surfaces. Male flowers have up to 22 stamens that are 0.5–0.7 by 0.5–0.7 millimeters. Female flowers have up to 9 carpels that are 1.5–1.8 by 0.5–1 millimeters. Each carpel has up to 5 ovules arranged in two rows. The fruit occur in clusters of up to 4 and are organized on densely hair peduncles that are 2–4 by 1 millimeters. The fruit are attached by densely hairy pedicels that are 15 by 1 millimeters. The fruit are globe-shaped and 10 by 7 millimeters with a 0.2 millimeter-long, pointed tip. The fruit are smooth, and very densely hairy.

=== Reproductive biology ===
The pollen of P. mindorensis is shed as permanent tetrads.

== Habitat and distribution ==
It has been observed growing in dry habitats, in deciduous forests at low elevations.
