= Mary Strong Clemens =

American botanist

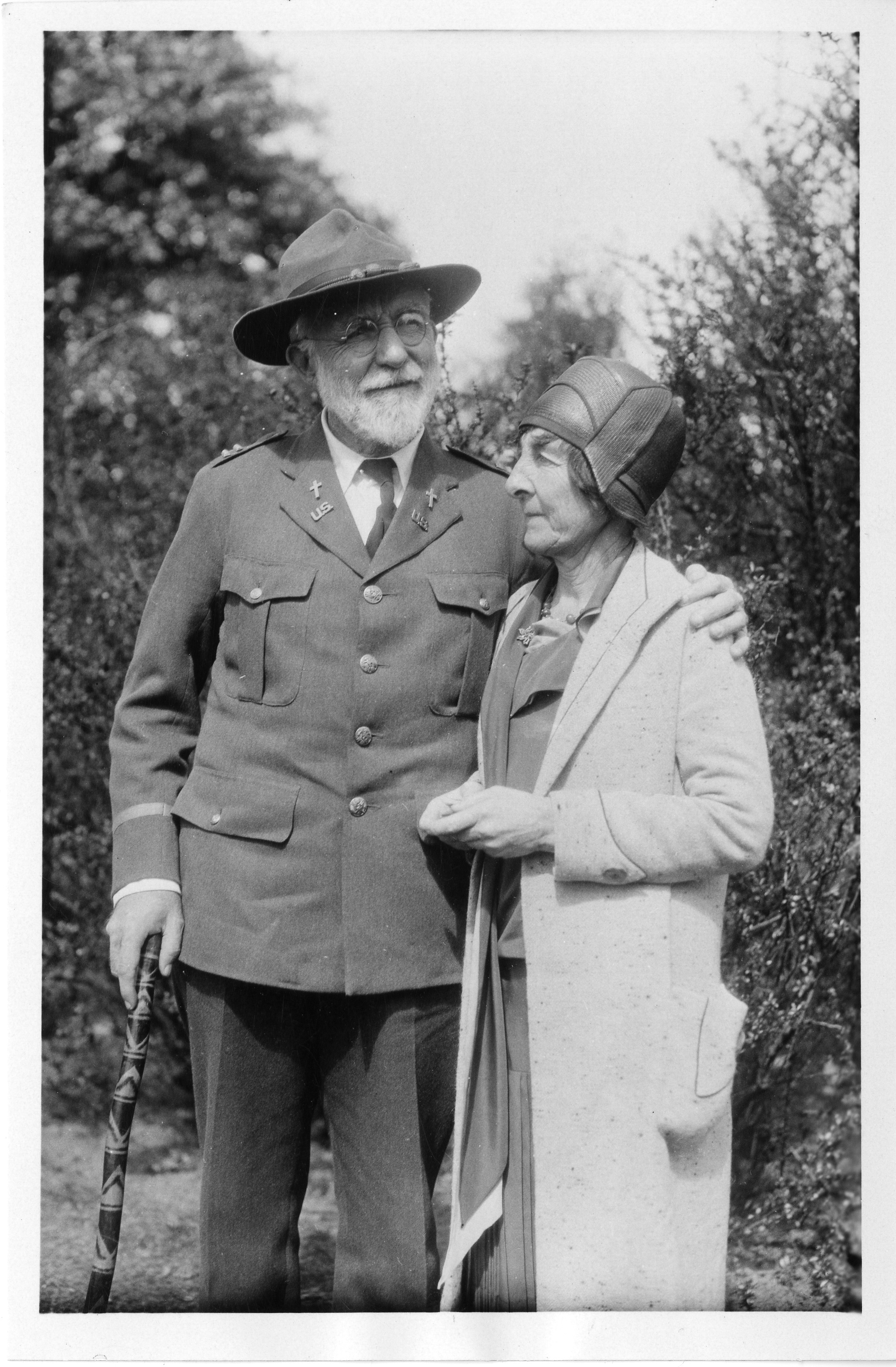
- Joseph and Mary Clemens.
- Born: 3 January 1873; New York, NY, United States
- Died: 13 April 1968 (aged 95); Brisbane Australia
- Scientific career
- Fields: Botanist; Plant collector
- Workplaces: Queensland Herbarium and collecting expeditions in Asia, New Guinea, Australia.

Mary Strong Clemens (3 January 1873 – 13 April 1968) was an American botanist and plant collector. A fanatical botanist, she collected plants assiduously throughout her long life, in the remote parts of the Philippines, Borneo, China, New Guinea and Australia. The latter part of her life was spent in Australia, where she died in Brisbane, Queensland.

== Life ==
Born in New York as Mary Knapp Strong, she married Joseph Clemens, a Methodist Episcopalian minister, in 1896. He joined the United States Army in 1901 as a chaplain, with the rank of captain, and served in the Philippines, America, and then France during the First World War, retiring in 1918. During the period spent in the Philippines in 1905–1907, she made extensive trips through Luzon and Mindanao. After her husband's retirement, he became her assistant and the couple worked as a team of professional, full-time botanical collectors. Usually Clemens collected the plants while her husband dried them and prepared them for shipment.

Between the First and Second World Wars the Clemenses visited Hebei and Shandong provinces in China as well as Indo-China, British North Borneo, Sarawak, Java and Singapore. Especially notable are their visits to Mount Kinabalu in northern Borneo in 1915, and again in 1931–1934, where they amassed the largest collections of plants ever made from that mountain.

Clemens reading on a porch at the Penibukan Ridge camp, Mount Kinabalu, circa 1933.

In August 1935 they went to the Mandated Territory of New Guinea where Joseph Clemens died in January 1936 of food poisoning from contaminated wild boar meat. Mary Clemens continued to work in New Guinea until December 1941 when she was compulsorily evacuated to Australia because of impending war.

In Australia she was allocated some space at the Queensland Herbarium in Brisbane, in a shed behind the main building, which she used as a base from which she continued her botanical collecting. Although the provision of facilities at the Herbarium was intended to be temporary and occasional, she settled in for the next 20 years. Living in a hostel 5 km away, she would walk to the herbarium early in the morning, and sometimes cook meals and sleep in her shed overnight, despite being ordered not to.

Her strong religious faith was expressed in such ways as writing quotations from the Bible daily in her field journal, frequent hymn-singing that brought complaints from co-residents and neighbours, and payment for field-trip accommodation with scripture lessons and hymn-singing.

Later in life Clemens restricted her botanical work in Australia to the state of Queensland and made field trips to Charleville (1945), the Jericho district (1946), the Mackay area (1947), the Maryborough district (1948), and to Ingham and Tully in North Queensland (1949). A broken hip in 1950 marked the end of extended field trips but she continued to work at the Queensland Herbarium until the early 1960s. She died peacefully on 13 April 1968, at the age of 95.

== Legacy ==
The following species of plants are named after her:

- Diospyros clementium Bakh. (with Joseph Clemens)
- Melicope clemensiae T.G.Hartley
- Pseuduvaria clemensiae Y.C.F.Su & R.M.K.Saunders
- Saurauia clementis Merr.
- Decalobanthus clemensianus (Ooststr.) A.R.Simões & Staples
- Erycibe clemensae Ooststr.
