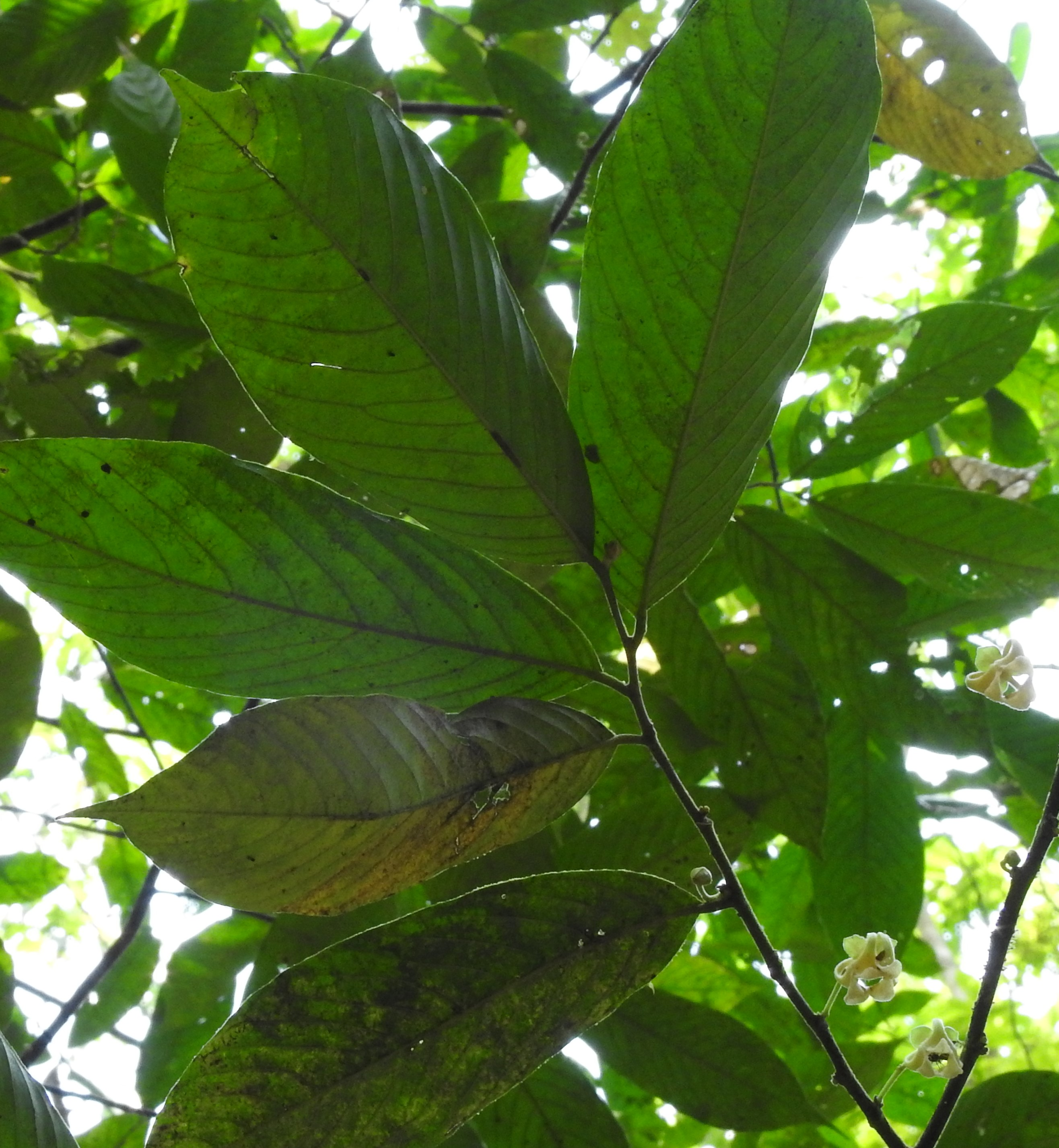

Scientific classification
- Kingdom: Plantae
- Clade: Tracheophytes
- Clade: Angiosperms
- Clade: Magnoliids
- Order: Magnoliales
- Family: Annonaceae
- Genus: Marsypopetalum
- Species: M. modestum

Binomial name
- Marsypopetalum modestum (Pierre) B.Xue & R.M.K.Saunders

Synonyms
- Homotypic: Polyalthia modesta (Pierre) Finet & Gagnep.; Unona modesta Pierre; Heterotypic: Goniothalamus meeboldii Craib; Goniothalamus tenasserimensis Biswas; Marsypopetalum crassum (R.Parker) B.Xue & R.M.K.Saunders; Polyalthia crassa R.Parker; Unona concinna Pierre

= Marsypopetalum modestum =

Species of flowering plant

Marsypopetalum modestum is a species of plants in the custard apple family Annonaceae native to Indo-China.
