= Pseuduvaria coriacea =

Scientific classification
- Kingdom: Plantae
- Clade: Tracheophytes
- Clade: Angiosperms
- Clade: Magnoliids
- Order: Magnoliales
- Family: Annonaceae
- Genus: Pseuduvaria
- Species: P. coriacea

Binomial name
- Pseuduvaria coriacea Y.C.F.Su & R.M.K.Saunders

Species of plant in the soursop family

Pseuduvaria coriacea is a species of plant in the family Annonaceae. It is native to New Guinea. Yvonne Chuan Fang Su and Richard M.K. Saunders, the botanists who first formally described the species, named it after its leathery (coriaceus in Latin) leaves.

== Description ==
It is a tree reaching 5 meters (16 ft) in height. Its elliptical to oval, thick, leathery leaves are 24–44 cm (9.4–17.3 in) by 6–14 cm (2.4–5.5 in). The leaves have heart-shaped bases and rounded to tapering tips. The leaves are hairless on their upper and lower surfaces except for the midrib which is densely hairy on the lower surface. The leaves have 16–26 pairs of secondary veins emanating from their midribs. Its densely hairy petioles are 4–9 by 2–5.5 millimeters with a groove on their upper side. Its Inflorescences are organized on short peduncles. Each inflorescence has up to 1–2 flowers. Each flower is on a densely hairy pedicel that is 4–7 by 0.5–2 millimeters. The flowering pedicels have a medial, densely hairy bract that is 1.5 millimeters long.The flowers are unisexual or hermaphroditic. Its flowers have 3 triangular sepals, that are 3.5 by 3 millimeters. The sepals are hairless on their upper surface, densely hairy on their lower surface, and have fine hairs on their margins. Its 6 petals are arranged in two rows of 3. The oval to elliptical, outer petals are 4–6 by 5–6.5 millimeters with hairless upper surfaces and densely hairy lower surfaces. The outer petals are dark purple-brown. The oval inner petals have a 0.5–1 millimeter long claw at their base and a 4–7 by 4–7.5 millimeter blade. The inner petals have pointed tips and flat bases. The red-orange inner petals are smooth on their upper surface and densely hairy on their lower surface. Male flowers have up to 70 stamens that are 0.6–0.9 by 0.5–0.9 millimeters. Hermaphroditic flowers have up to 23 stamens that are 0.6–0.9 by 0.5–0.9 millimeters and up to 11 carpels that are 2–2.4 by 1–.14 millimeters. Each carpel has 4–10 ovules arranged in two rows. Fruit are on sparsely hairy pedicels that are 4–11 by 2.4 millimeters. The fruit occur in clusters of 4–8 monocarps. The mature monocarps are oval to ellipsoidal and 13–30 by 8–30 millimeters. The mature, orange monocarps are smooth and covered in hair. Each monocarp has around 4–10 seeds arranged in two rows. The smooth, hemi-spherical seeds are 9.5–13.5 by 6–9.5 by 2.5–5 millimeters.

=== Reproductive biology ===
The pollen of P. coriacea is shed as permanent tetrads.

== Habitat and distribution ==
It has been observed growing in lowland forests, at elevations from 60 to 900 meters (200 to 2,950 ft).
