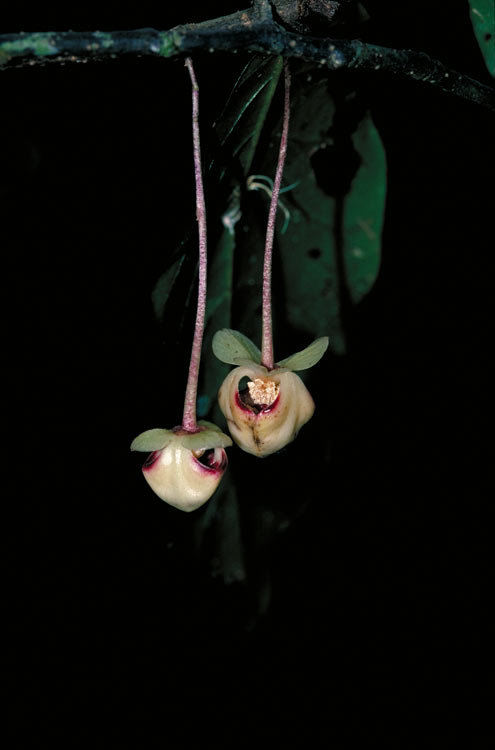
- Flowers

Conservation status
- Least Concern (NCA)

Scientific classification
- Kingdom: Plantae
- Clade: Tracheophytes
- Clade: Angiosperms
- Clade: Magnoliids
- Order: Magnoliales
- Family: Annonaceae
- Genus: Pseuduvaria
- Species: P. glabrescens

Binomial name
- Pseuduvaria glabrescens (Jessup) Y.C.F.Su & R.M.K.Saunders

Synonyms
- Pseuduvaria mulgraveana var. glabrescens Jessup

= Pseuduvaria glabrescens =

Species of flowering plant

Pseuduvaria glabrescens is a small tree in the custard apple family Annonaceae endemic to a very small part of coastal Queensland, Australia. It was first described as a variety of Pseuduvaria mulgraveana, and later raised to species status.

== Description ==
Pseuduvaria glabrescens is a tree reaching 9 m (30 ft) in height and a trunk diameter of up to 10 cm (3.9 in). Branches are dark brown to black and sparsely hairy, becoming hairless. The young branches are also densely covered in lenticels. Leaves may be elliptic, ovate or obovate, papery, and are up to 16 cm (6.3 in) long by 6.5 cm (2.6 in) wide. They have rounded bases and tapering tips, with the tapering portion up to 16 mm (0.63 in) long. They are glabrous (smooth, hairless) on both surfaces. There are 8–12 pairs of lateral veins emanating from the midrib. The petioles are very finely hairy, up to 6 mm (0.24 in) long by 2.5 mm (0.10 in) wide, and have a broad groove on their upper side.

The inflorescences are produced either in the leaf axils or on younger branches in a process known as ramiflory. They are solitary on unobtrusive peduncles, each with a solitary flower. The pedicels are puberulous (minutely hairy) and measure up to 50 mm (1.97 in) long with a puberulous medial bract up to 1.2 mm (0.05 in) long. There are three sepals measuring up to 2 mm (0.08 in) long and wide, ovate in shape, and subglabrous on the outer surface. There are two whorls of three petals — the outer petals are cream-coloured and measure up to 6 mm (0.24 in) by 7 mm (0.28 in), the inner petals are cream with pink-red or purple highlights and measure up to 8 mm (0.31 in) long by 7 mm (0.28 in) wide. The inner petals have a pair of prominent, smooth, elliptical glands on their inner surface. Male flowers have up to 70-80 stamens that are up to 1 mm (0.04 in) long and wide. Female flowers have up to 29 carpels that are about 2 mm (0.08 in) long by 1 mm (0.04 in) wide. Each carpel has 1–2 ovules. Female flowers also have 6–17 sterile stamens.

The fruit occur in clusters of 3–18 on glabrous pedicles that are 55 mm (2.17 in) long 2 mm (0.08 in) wide. The orange, mature fruit are elliptical to globe-shaped and up to 16 mm (0.63 in) by 12 mm (0.47 in) with a tapering tip about 0.8 mm (0.03 in) long. The fruit are more or less smooth and puberulous, and contain two globose seeds that are about 9 mm (0.35 in) by 7 mm (0.28 in).

=== Etymology ===
The genus name Pseuduvaria was created from the word pseudo- meaning 'false', and the name Uvaria, a related genus. The species epithet glabrescens is Latin for 'becoming hairless'.

=== Phytochemistry ===
Oils extracted from its leaves contain high levels of elemicin and methyl eugenol.

=== Reproductive biology ===
The pollen of P. glabrescens is shed as permanent tetrads.

== Taxonomy ==
The species Pseuduvaria mulgraveana was first described in 1987 by the Australian botanist Laurence W. Jessup. In his paper Jessup also described the varieties P. m var. mulgraveana and P. m var. glabrescens, and his reasoning was given in this very brief summation — "Distinguished from P. mulgraveana var. mulgraveana by the indumentum of the branchlets and petioles being very short and sparse and the glabrescent leaves." However, the botanists Yvonne Chuan Fang Su and Richard M.K. Saunders, in a monograph published by in 2010, found that the two varieties were "substantially different in vegetative and floral morphology", and they detailed differences in the hairiness of the branches, petioles and midribs, and in the size, shape and/or number of leaves, sepals, petals and stamens. Based on these observed differences the pair raised P. m. var. glabrescens to species status with the combination Pseuduvaria glabrescens.

While the species status of this taxon is recognised by Plants of the World Online, neither the Australian National Herbarium nor the Queensland Herbarium accept it—both continue to recognise the variety as originally named by Jessup.

== Distribution and habitat ==
This species is restricted to a small part of Queensland's Wet Tropics, between the Mowbray River near Port Douglas, and the Mulgrave River south of Cairns. It grows in well developed rainforest on metamorphic, basalt and granite soils, at altitudes from near sea level to about 800 m (2,600 ft).

== Ecology ==
This plant serves as a host species for larvae of the green triangle butterfly (Graphium macfarlanei), and its flowers are pollinated by flies.
