= Marsypopetalum littorale =

Scientific classification
- Kingdom: Plantae
- Clade: Tracheophytes
- Clade: Angiosperms
- Clade: Magnoliids
- Order: Magnoliales
- Family: Annonaceae
- Genus: Marsypopetalum
- Species: M. littorale

Binomial name
- Marsypopetalum littorale (Blume) B.Xue & R.M.K.Saunders

Synonyms
- Guatteria littoralis Blume; Monoon littorale (Blume) Miq.; Polyalthia littoralis (Blume) Boerl.; Polyalthia littoralis subsp. daclacensis]] Bân; Polyalthia schefferi Stapf; Polyalthia zhui X.L.Hou & S.J.Li

Species of flowering plant

Marsypopetalum littorale is a species of plants in the custard apple family Annonaceae native to southern China, Hainan, Java, Lesser Sunda Islands, Thailand and Vietnam.
