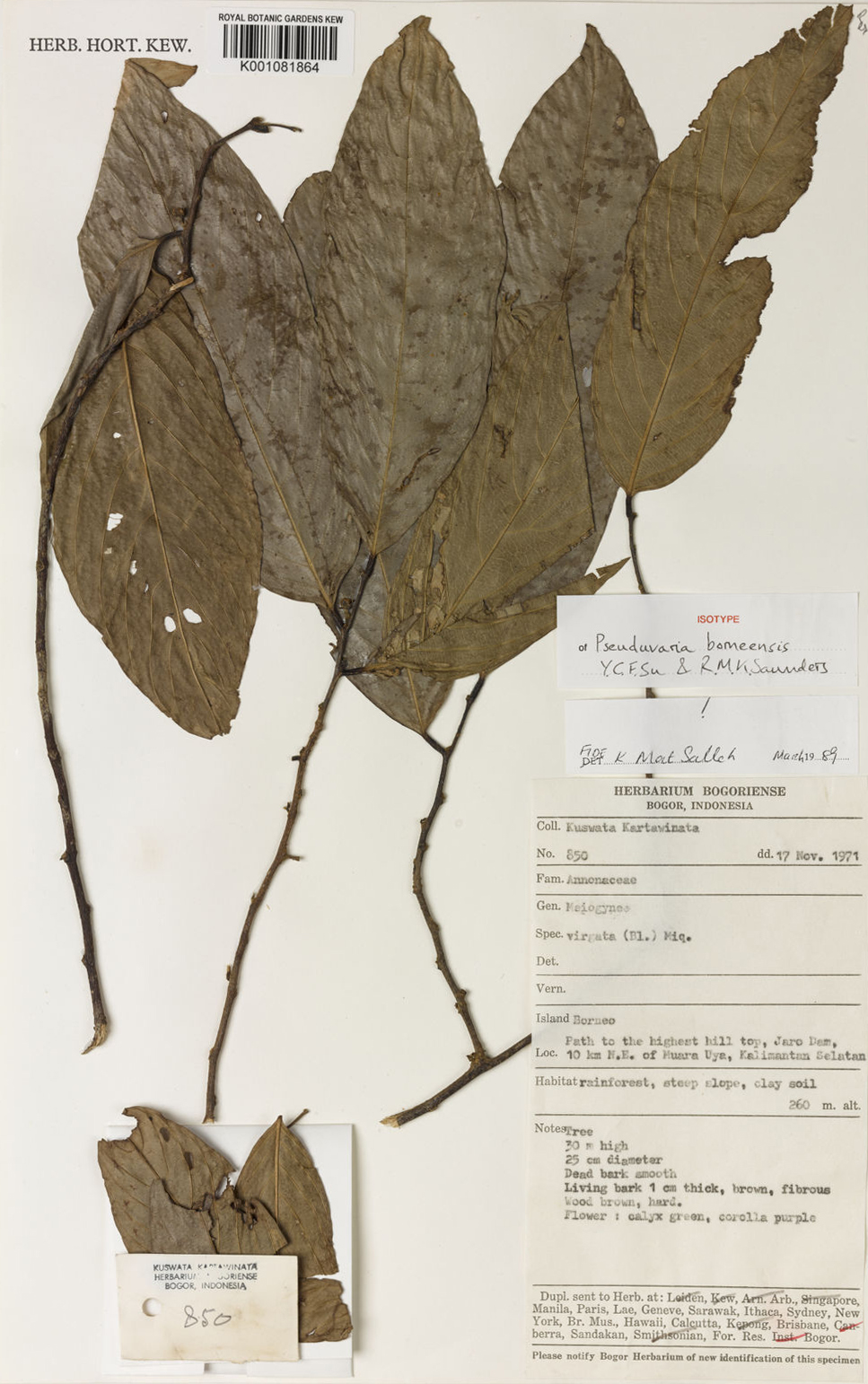
- Herbarium specimen of Pseuduvaria borneensis.

Conservation status
- Least Concern (IUCN 3.1)

Scientific classification
- Kingdom: Plantae
- Clade: Embryophytes
- Clade: Tracheophytes
- Clade: Spermatophytes
- Clade: Angiosperms
- Clade: Magnoliids
- Order: Magnoliales
- Family: Annonaceae
- Genus: Pseuduvaria
- Species: P. borneensis

Binomial name
- Pseuduvaria borneensis Y.C.F.Su & R.M.K.Saunders

= Pseuduvaria borneensis =

Species of plant in the soursop family

Pseuduvaria borneensis is a species of flowering plant in the family Annonaceae. It is a tree endemic to Borneo. Yvonne Chuan Fang Su and Richard M.K. Saunders, the botanists who first formally described the species, named it after the regions of Borneo where it is distributed including East Kalimantan, Sabah and Sarawak.

== Description ==
It is a tree reaching 30 meters (98 ft) in height. Its branches have sparse lenticels. Its papery leaves are 13–20 by 3.5–8 centimeters and come to a point at their tips. The leaves are hairless on their upper surface and densely hairy on their lower surfaces. The leaves have 10–16 pairs of secondary veins emanating from their midribs. Its hairy petioles are 5–15 millimeters long with a groove on their upper side. Inflorescences are organized on short inconspicuous peduncles. Each inflorescence consists of 1–2 flowers. Each flower is on a densely hairy pedicel 4–9 millimeters in length. The flowers unisexual. Its flowers have 3 sepals, 2–3 by 1.5–3 millimeters. The sepals are smooth on their upper surface, hairy on their lower surface, and have fine hairs on their margins. Its 6 petals are arranged in two rows of 3. The outer elliptical petals are 3–7.5 by 3.7.5 millimeters with smooth upper surfaces and densely hairy lower surfaces. The outer petals vary in color from light green to purple. The inner petals have a 4–9 millimeter long claw at their base and a 8–19 by 4–8 millimeter blade. The inner petals are smooth on their upper surface, densely hairy on their lower surface and have hairy margins. The inner surfaces of the inner petals have numerous distinctive glands. Male flowers have 100–143 stamens that are 0.6–1.1 millimeters long. Female flowers have up to 15 carpels per flower and 6–7 ovules per carpel. Fruit are on pedicels 5–21 millimeters in length. The fruit consists of up to 6 monocarps. Each mature monocarp is a 24–34 by 23–30 millimeter ellipsoid. The mature monocarps are green, wrinkly and have prominent ridges. Each monocarp has 6–9 seeds. The seeds are 15–19 by 6–9.5 millimeters.

=== Reproductive biology ===
The pollen of P. beccarii is shed as permanent tetrads.

== Range and habitat ==
Pseududuvaria borneensis is endemic to Borneo. It is widespread on the island, and is found in east and north Kalimantan in Indonesian Borneo, as well as in Sabah and Sarawak in Malaysian Borneo and in Brunei. The species' estimated area of occupancy (AOO) is 52 km^{2} (20 sq mi) and its estimated extent of occurrence (EOO) is 176,441 km^{2} (68,124 sq mi).

It grows in primary and secondary lowland rain forests from 100 to 1,070 meters (330 to 3,510 ft) elevation. It often grows by streams on sandstone, clay, and coral limestone soils.
