= Pseuduvaria clemensiae =

Scientific classification
- Kingdom: Plantae
- Clade: Tracheophytes
- Clade: Angiosperms
- Clade: Magnoliids
- Order: Magnoliales
- Family: Annonaceae
- Genus: Pseuduvaria
- Species: P. clemensiae

Binomial name
- Pseuduvaria clemensiae Y.C.F.Su & R.M.K.Saunders

Species of plant in the soursop family

Pseuduvaria clemensiae is a species of plant in the family Annonaceae. It is native to New Guinea. Yvonne Chuan Fang Su and Richard M.K. Saunders, the botanists who first formally described the species, named it after Mary Strong Clemens who collected the specimen they examined.

== Description ==
It is a tree reaching 3 meters (9.8 ft) in height. Its long, narrow, papery leaves are 19.5–27 cm (7.7–10.6 in) by 2–3 cm (0.8–1.2 in). The leaves have rounded bases and pointed tips. The leaves are hairless on their upper and lower surfaces and except for the midrib which is densely hairy on the lower surface. The leaves have 18–24 pairs of secondary veins emanating from their midribs. Its hairy petioles are 3–6 by 1.5–2.5 millimeters with a groove on their upper side. Inflorescences are organized on short peduncles. Each inflorescence has up to 1–2 flowers. Each flower is on a densely hairy pedicel that are 7 by 0.5 millimeters. The flowers are unisexual. Its flowers have 3 triangular sepals, that are 1 by 1 millimeters. The sepals are hairless on their upper surface, hairy on their lower surface, and have fine hairs on their margins. Its 6 petals are arranged in two rows of 3. The circular, outer petals are 3.5 by 3.5 millimeters with hairless upper surfaces and densely hairy lower surfaces. The outer petals are purple. The diamond-shaped inner petals have a 0.6–1 millimeter long claw at their base and a 3.5 by 2.5–3 millimeter blade. The inner petals are pointed at their tip and base. The purple inner petals are smooth on their upper surface and densely hairy on their lower surface. Male flowers have up to 28 stamens that are 0.5–0.8 by 0.6 millimeters. Fruit are on densely hairy pedicels that are 10 by 2 millimeters. The fruit consists of up to 2 monocarps. Each mature monocarp is a 15–16 by 10–15 millimeter globe. The pale brown-green, mature monocarps are smooth and densely covered in hair. Each monocarp has around 5 seeds. The wrinkly, hemi-spherical seeds are 9–10 by 4.5–6.5 by 3–5 millimeters.

=== Reproductive biology ===
The pollen of P. clemensiae is shed as permanent tetrads.

== Habitat and distribution ==
It has been observed growing in forests, at elevations from 90 to 920 meters (300 to 3,020 ft).
