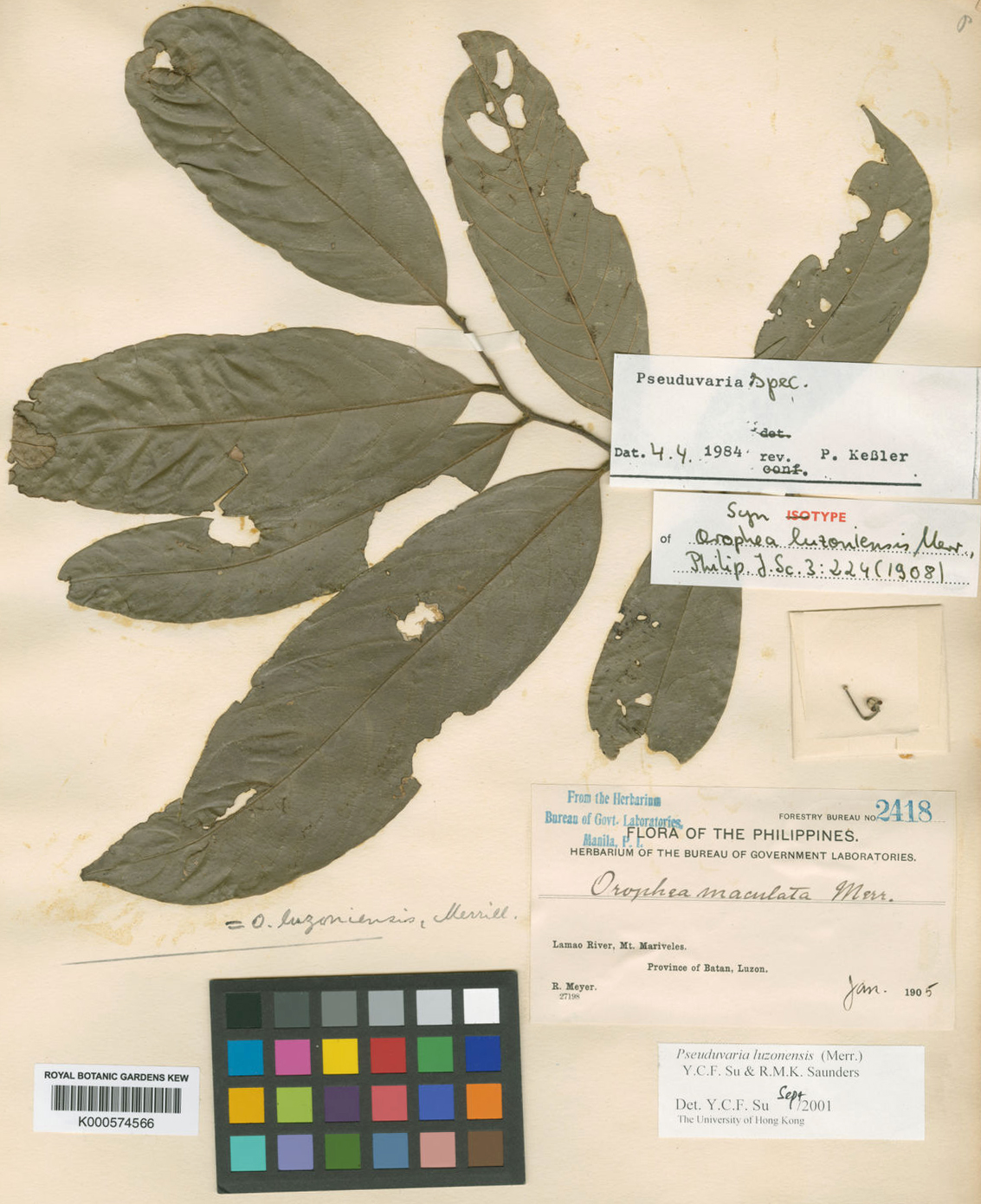
- Herbarium specimen of Pseuduvaria luzoniensis.

Conservation status
- Endangered (IUCN 3.1)

Scientific classification
- Kingdom: Plantae
- Clade: Embryophytes
- Clade: Tracheophytes
- Clade: Spermatophytes
- Clade: Angiosperms
- Clade: Magnoliids
- Order: Magnoliales
- Family: Annonaceae
- Genus: Pseuduvaria
- Species: P. luzoniensis

Binomial name
- Pseuduvaria luzoniensis (Merr.) Y.C.F.Su & R.M.K.Saunders

Synonyms
- Orophea luzoniensis Merr.; Orophea maculata Merr.; Pseuduvaria grandiflora Merr.

= Pseuduvaria luzoniensis =

Species of plant in the soursop family

Pseuduvaria luzoniensis is a species of plant in the family Annonaceae. It is native to The Philippines. Elmer Drew Merrill, the American botanist who first formally described the species using the synonym Orophea luzoniensis, named it after Luzon in the province of Battan, Philippines where the specimen he examined was collected along the Lamao River.

== Description ==
It is a tree reaching 10 meters (33 ft) in height. The young, yellow-brown to black branches are densely hairy, but become hairless when mature. The branches also have sparse lenticels. Its elliptical, papery to leathery leaves are 10–27 by 3–8.5 centimeters. The leaves have pointed to wedge-shaped bases and tapering tips, with the tapering portion 5–19 millimeters long. The leaves are hairless on their upper surfaces and sparsely hairy on their lower surfaces. The leaves have 10–18 pairs of secondary veins emanating from their midribs. Its very densely hairy petioles are 4–12 by 1–3 millimeters with a broad groove on their upper side. Its Inflorescences occur alone or in pairs on branches, and are organized on indistinct peduncles. Each inflorescence has 1–2 flowers. Each flower is on a very densely hairy pedicel that is 12–30 by 0.3–0.8 millimeters. The pedicels are organized on a rachis up to 5 millimeters long that have 2–3 bracts. The pedicels have a medial, very densely hairy bract that is 0.5–1.5 millimeters long. Its flowers are unisexual. Its flowers have 3 oval sepals, that are 1.5–2.5 by 1.5–2.5 millimeters. The sepals are hairless on their upper surface, very densely hairy on their lower surface, and hairy at their margins. Its 6 petals are arranged in two rows of 3. The greenish-white, circular, outer petals are 2.5–4.5 by 2–3.5 millimeters with hairless upper surfaces and very densely hairy lower surfaces. The inner petals are greenish-white to yellowish-green. The diamond-shaped, inner petals have a 7–14 millimeter long claw at their base and a 11–20 by 7–12 millimeter blade. The inner petals have pointed bases and pointed to tapering tips. The inner petals are hairless on their upper surface except near their tips, and densely hairy on their lower surfaces. Male flowers have 70–85 stamens that are 0.6–1 by 0.5–0.8 millimeters. Female flowers have 13–14 carpels that are 2–2.5 by 0.7–1 millimeters. Each carpel has 4–6 ovules arranged in a row. The female flowers have 2–7 sterile stamens. The fruit occur in clusters of up to 3 on slightly hairy pedicles that are 16–18 by 1 millimeters. The yellow-green fruit are elliptical and 6–7 by 4 millimeters. The fruit are smooth, and very densely hairy.

=== Reproductive biology ===
The pollen of P. luzoniensis is shed as permanent tetrads.

== Habitat and distribution ==
It has been observed growing in lowland forests at elevations of 90–100 meters (300–330 ft).
