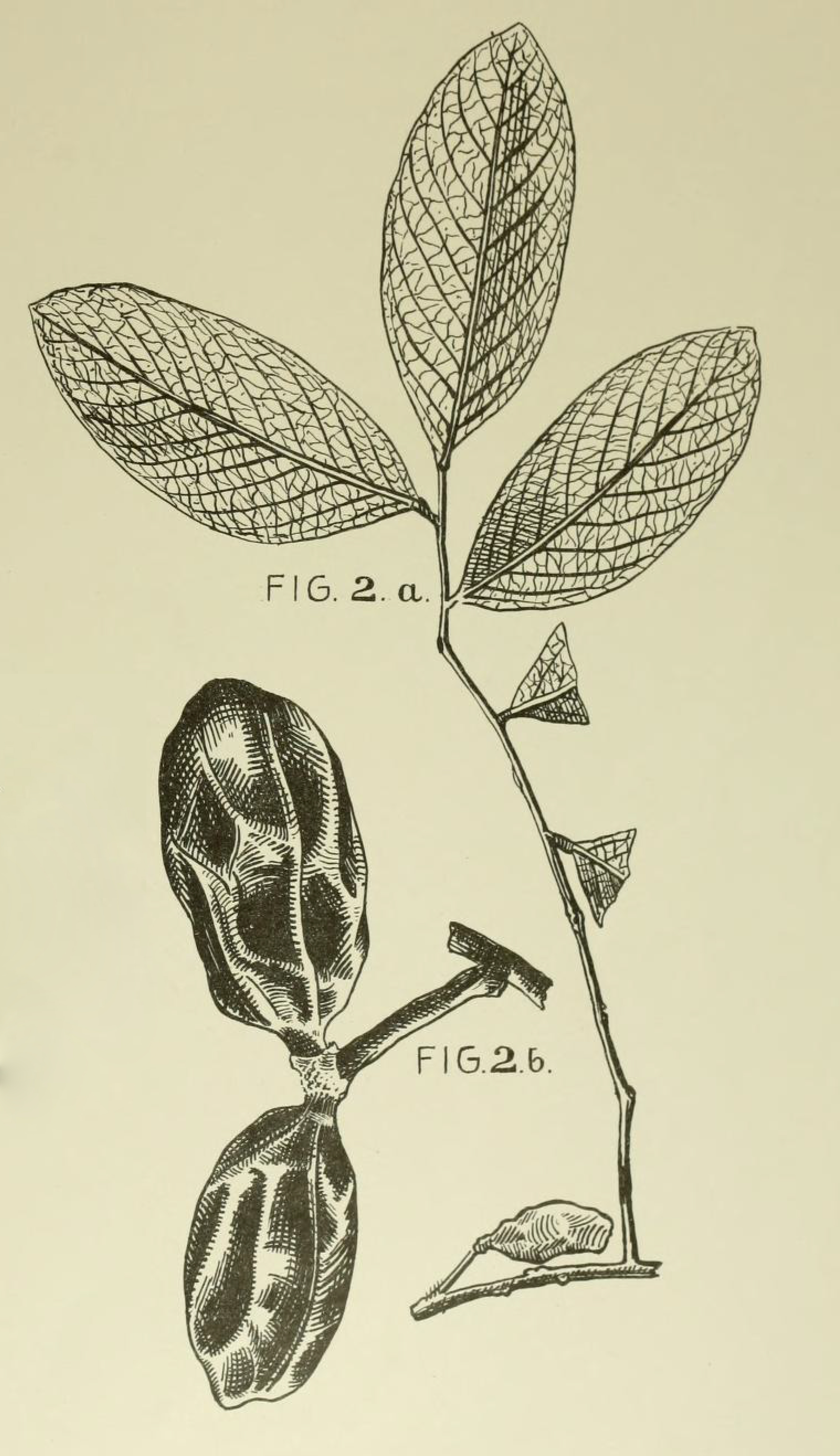
- Botanical illustration of Pseuduvaria macrocarpa using the synonym Meiogyne macrocarpa

Scientific classification
- Kingdom: Plantae
- Clade: Tracheophytes
- Clade: Angiosperms
- Clade: Magnoliids
- Order: Magnoliales
- Family: Annonaceae
- Genus: Pseuduvaria
- Species: P. macrocarpa

Binomial name
- Pseuduvaria macrocarpa (Burck) Y.C.F.Su & R.M.K.Saunders

Synonyms
- Meiogyne macrocarpa Burck; Mitrephora versteegii Diels; Pseuduvaria versteegii (Diels) Merr.

= Pseuduvaria macrocarpa =

Species of plant in the soursop family

Pseuduvaria macrocarpa is a species of plant in the family Annonaceae. It is native to The Maluku Islands and New Guinea. William Burck, the Dutch botanist who first formally described the species using the synonym Meiogyne macrocarpa, named it after its large fruit (Latinized forms of Greek μακρoς, macros and καρπoς, karpos).

== Description ==
It is a tree reaching 30 meters (98 ft) in height. The young, gray to dark brown branches are sparsely hairy, but become hairless when mature. The branches have sparse lenticels. Its elliptical, slightly leathery to leathery leaves are 14–31.5 cm (5.5–12.4 in) by 5–13 cm (2.0–5.1 in). The leaves have wedge-shaped to rounded bases and tapering tips, with the tapering portion 4–18 millimeters long. The leaves are hairless on their upper surfaces and sparsely hairy on their lower surfaces. The leaves have 10–20 pairs of secondary veins emanating from their midribs. Its sparsely to densely hairy petioles are 6–15 by 1.5–3.5 millimeters with a broad groove on their upper side. Its Inflorescences occur in clusters of 5–8 on branches, and are organized on indistinct peduncles. Each inflorescence has 1–2 flowers. Each flower is on a densely hairy pedicel that is 13–32 by 0.3–0.9 millimeters. The pedicels are organized on a rachis up to 5 millimeters long that have up to 2 bracts. The pedicels have a medial, very densely hairy bract that is 0.5–2 millimeters long. Its flowers are unisexual. Its flowers have 3 oval sepals, that are 1–2 by 1.5–3 millimeters and partially fused at their bases. The sepals are hairless on their upper surface, densely hairy on their lower surface, and hairy at their margins. Its 6 petals are arranged in two rows of 3. The cream-colored, oval to elliptical, outer petals are 2.5–4.5 by 2.5–5 millimeters with hairless upper surfaces and densely hairy lower surfaces. The light yellow to golden yellow, diamond-shaped inner petals have a 2–8 millimeter long claw at their base and a 3–11 by 2–5 millimeter blade. The inner petals have pointed bases and tips. The inner petals are slightly hairy on their upper surfaces, and very densely hairy on their lower surfaces. The inner petals have a solitary, butterfly-shaped, smooth, raised gland on their upper surfact. Male flowers have 30–42 stamens that are 0.5–0.9 by 0.6–1 millimeters. Female flowers have 8–9 carpels that are 1–2 by 2.5–3.5 millimeters. Each carpel has 5–7 ovules arranged in two rows. The female flowers have 10–13 sterile stamens. The fruit occur in clusters of up to 5 on slightly hairy pedicles that are 10–35 by 1.5–4.5 millimeters. The brown, elliptical fruit are 18–46 by 10–31 millimeters. The fruit are wrinkly, and very densely hairy. Each fruit has 4–7 hemi-spherical to lens-shaped seeds that are 10–14.5 by 7–10 by 4–8 millimeters and are arranged in two rows. The seeds are wrinkly.

=== Reproductive biology ===
The pollen of P. macrocarpa is shed as permanent tetrads.

== Habitat and distribution ==
It has been observed growing in low-nutrient and clay soils in lowland or submontane forests at elevations of 30–2,400 meters (98–7,900 ft).
