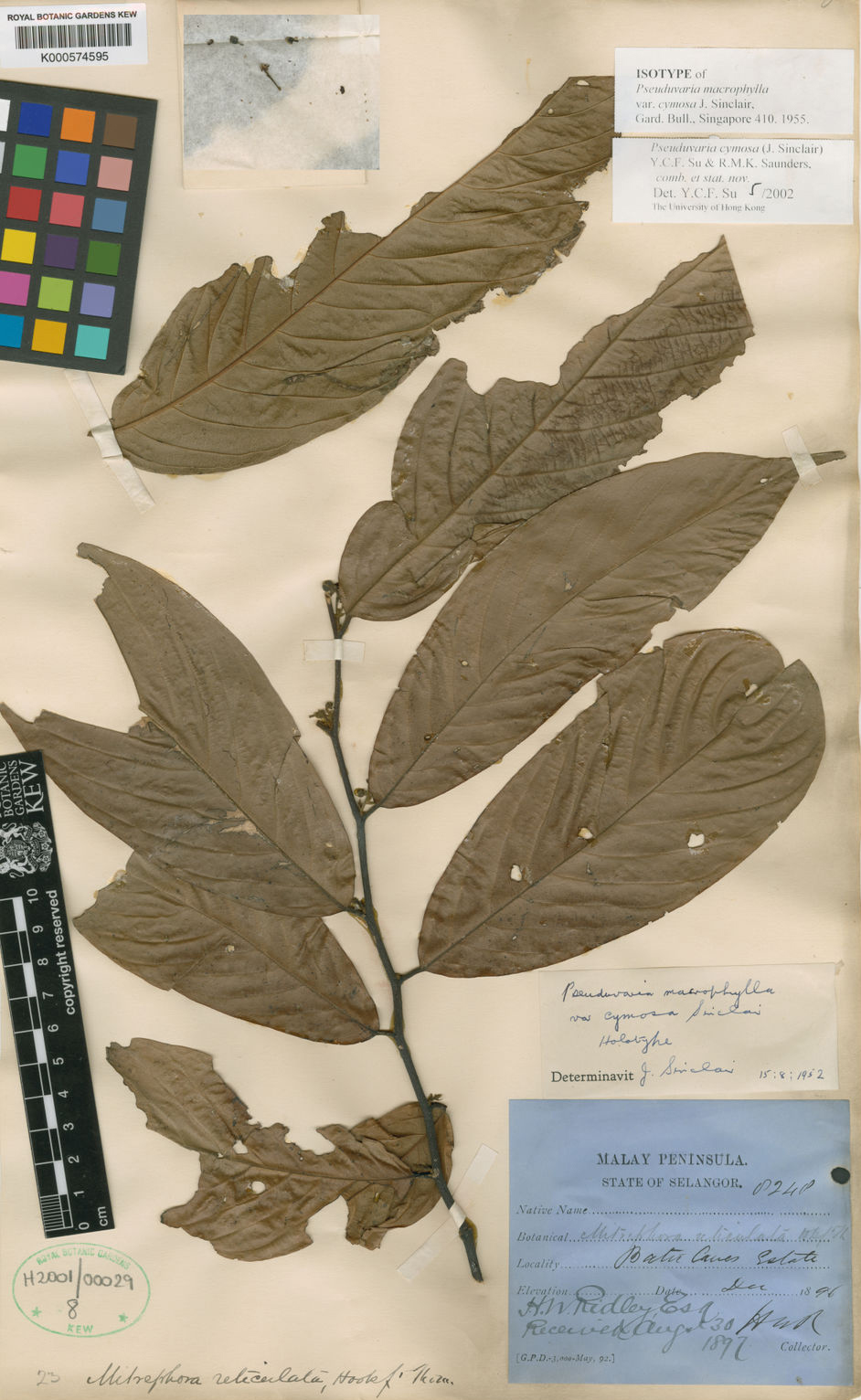
- Herbarium specimen of Pseuduvaria cymosa.

Scientific classification
- Kingdom: Plantae
- Clade: Tracheophytes
- Clade: Angiosperms
- Clade: Magnoliids
- Order: Magnoliales
- Family: Annonaceae
- Genus: Pseuduvaria
- Species: P. cymosa

Binomial name
- Pseuduvaria cymosa (J.Sinclair) Y.C.F.Su & R.M.K.Saunders

Synonyms
- Pseuduvaria macrophylla var. cymosa J.Sinclair

= Pseuduvaria cymosa =

Species of plant in the soursop family

Pseuduvaria cymosa is a species of plant in the family Annonaceae. It is native to Peninsular Malaysia. James Sinclair, the Scottish botanist who first formally described the species using the synonym Pseuduvaria macrophylla var. cymosa, named it after its branched inflorescences which are called cymes.

== Description ==
It is a tree reaching 18 meters (59 ft) in height. Its elliptical, moderately leathery leaves are 14.5–23 by 4–10 centimeters. The leaves have blunt bases and tapering tips, with the tapering portion 6–14 millimeters long. The leaves are hairless on their upper and lower surfaces except for the midrib which can be sparsely hairy. The leaves have 14–18 pairs of secondary veins emanating from their midribs. Its densely hairy petioles are 5–9 by 1.5–3 millimeters with a broad groove on their upper side. Its Inflorescences are solitary or occur in pairs and are organized on 2–4 millimeter-long, densely hairy peduncles. Each inflorescence has up to 4 flower. Each flower is on a densely hairy pedicel that is 5–15 by 0.5–0.9 millimeters. The pedicels are organized on a rachis up to 5 millimeters long. The flowering pedicels have a medial, densely hairy bract that is 0.5–1 millimeters long. The flowers are unisexual. Its flowers have 3 triangular sepals, that are 1.5 by 1.5–2.5 millimeters. The sepals are hairless on their upper surface, and sparsely hairy on their lower surface. Its 6 petals are arranged in two rows of 3. The red to yellowish-purple, oval, outer petals are 2–2.5 by 2.5–3.5 millimeters with hairless upper surfaces and densely hairy lower surfaces. The red to yellowish-purple, triangular, inner petals have a 1.5–3 millimeter long claw at their base and a 4–6.5 by 3–3.5 millimeter blade. The inner petals have pointed tips and wedge-shaped bases. The upper and lower surfaces of the inner petals are mostly hairless. There is a solitary, smooth, elliptical gland on the upper surface of the inner petals.Male flowers have up to 65 stamens that are 0.8–1 by 0.5 millimeters. Female flowers have up to 13 carpels that are 1.6–1.8 by 0.8–0.9 millimeters. Each carpel has 4 ovules arranged in a single row. The female flowers have up to 9 sterile stamen.The fruit occur in clusters of 1–8 and are on sparsely hairy pedicles that are 15–30 by 1–3 millimeters. The mature fruit are round and 5–16 by 5–15 millimeters. The mature, smooth, densely hairy fruit have a sharp point that is 0.3–0.4 millimeters long. Each fruit has up to 2 seeds. The wrinkled, spherical seeds are 9–9.5 by 8.5 by 4.5–5.5 millimeters.

=== Reproductive biology ===
The pollen of P. cymosa is shed as permanent tetrads.

== Habitat and distribution ==
It has been observed growing near streams.
