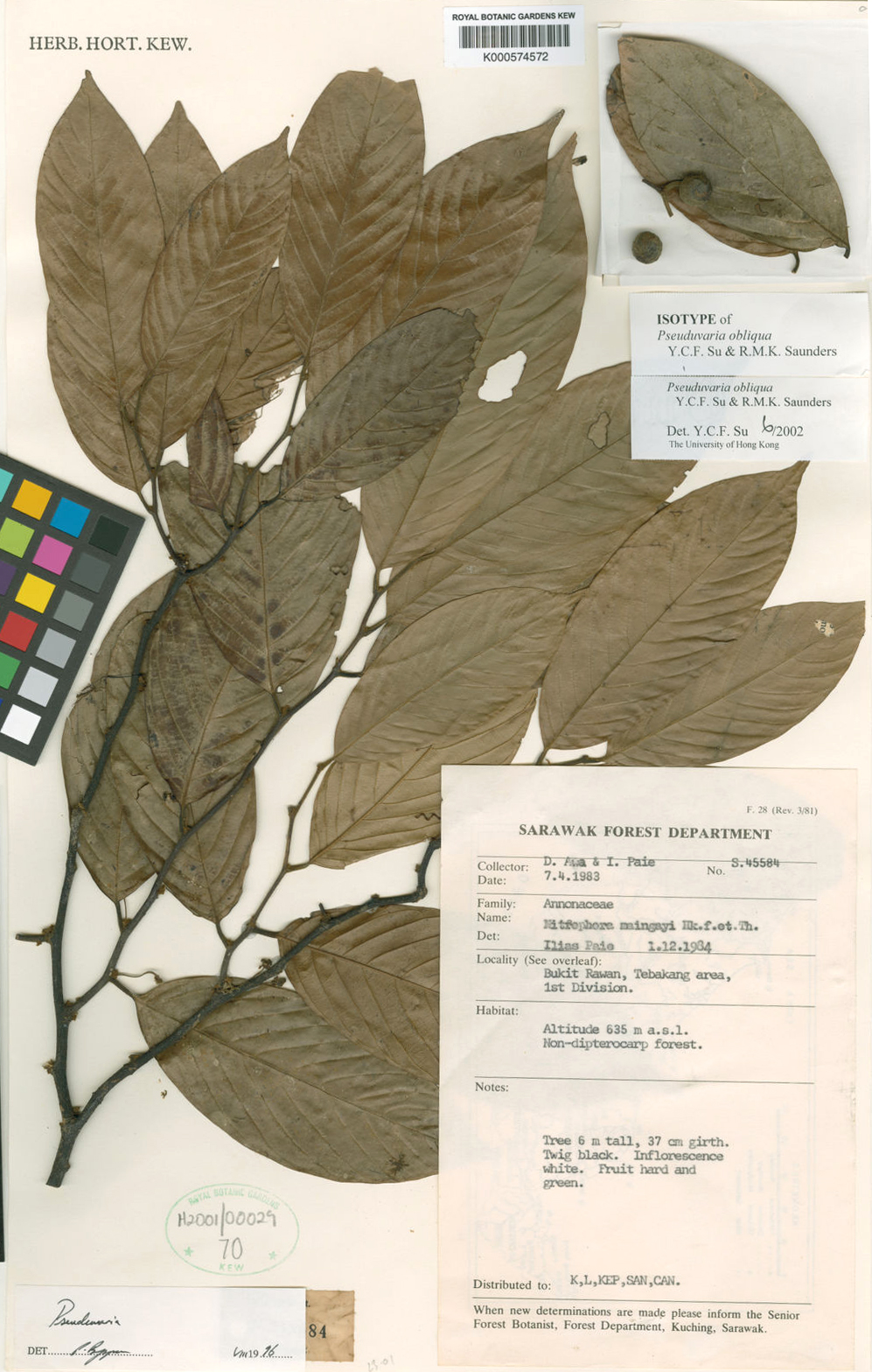
- Herbarium specimen of Pseuduvaria obliqua

Conservation status
- Endangered (IUCN 3.1)

Scientific classification
- Kingdom: Plantae
- Clade: Embryophytes
- Clade: Tracheophytes
- Clade: Spermatophytes
- Clade: Angiosperms
- Clade: Magnoliids
- Order: Magnoliales
- Family: Annonaceae
- Genus: Pseuduvaria
- Species: P. obliqua

Binomial name
- Pseuduvaria obliqua Y.C.F.Su & R.M.K.Saunders

= Pseuduvaria obliqua =

Species of plant in the soursop family

Pseuduvaria obliqua is a species of plant in the family Annonaceae. It is native to Borneo. Yvonne Su and Richard Saunders, the botanists who first formally described the species, named it after its slightly uneven (obliqua, in Latin) leaf bases.

== Description ==
It is a tree reaching 20 meters (66 ft) in height. The young, light to dark brown branches are very densely hairy and have sparse lenticels. Its elliptical to oval, papery leaves are 13–25 cm (5.1–9.8 in) by 5–8 cm (2.0–3.1 in). The bases of the leaves are slightly uneven and pointed to broadly heart-shaped. The leaves have tapering tips, with the tapering portion 12–25 mm (0.47–0.98 in) long. The leaves are hairless on their upper surfaces and sparsely hairy on their lower surfaces. The leaves have 14–18 pairs of secondary veins emanating from their midribs. Its very densely hairy petioles are 6–15 by 1.5–2.5 millimeters with a broad groove on their upper side. Its Inflorescences occur in clusters of 2–4 on branches, and are organized on indistinct peduncles. Each inflorescence has a single flower. Each flower is on a densely hairy pedicel that is 9–16 by 0.4–0.8 millimeters. The pedicels are organized on a rachis up to 5 millimeters long that have up to 4 bracts. The pedicels have a medial, very densely hairy bract that is 0.7–1 millimeters long. Its flowers are unisexual. Its flowers have 3 free, oval sepals, that are 1–1.5 by 1–1.5 millimeters. The sepals are hairless on their upper surface, densely hairy on their lower surface, and hairy at their margins. Its 6 petals are arranged in two rows of 3. The cream-colored to light brown, oval, outer petals are 1.5–2.5 by 1.5–2 millimeters with hairless upper and densely hairy lower surfaces. The cream-colored to light brown, triangular inner petals have a 2.5–5.5 millimeter long claw at their base and a 4.5–8 by 2.5–4 millimeter blade. The inner petals have slightly heart-shaped bases and pointed tips. The inner petals are very densely hairy on their upper and lower surfaces. The inner petals sometimes have a solitary, rod shaped, smooth, raised gland on their upper surface. The male flowers have 27–37 stamens that are 1–1.5 by 2–2.5 millimeters. The female flowers have 9–11 carpels that are 1.4–1.7 by 0.6–1 millimeters. Each carpel has 1–2 ovules arranged in a row. The fruit occur in clusters of 3–6 that are organized on indistinct peduncles. The fruit are attached by slightly hairy pedicles that are 19–21 by 1.5 millimeters. The green, mature globe-shaped fruit are 9–13 by 9–12 millimeters. The fruit are wrinkly, and densely hairy. Each fruit has up to 2 spherical, wrinkly seeds that are 6.5–8 by 6.5–7 by 3.5–4 millimeters.

=== Reproductive biology ===
The pollen of P. obliqua is shed as permanent tetrads.

== Habitat and distribution ==
It has been observed growing in forests at elevations of 100–750 meters (330–2,460 ft).
