= Pseuduvaria glossopetala =

Scientific classification
- Kingdom: Plantae
- Clade: Tracheophytes
- Clade: Angiosperms
- Clade: Magnoliids
- Order: Magnoliales
- Family: Annonaceae
- Genus: Pseuduvaria
- Species: P. glossopetala

Binomial name
- Pseuduvaria glossopetala Y.C.F.Su & R.M.K.Saunders

Species of plant in the soursop family

Pseuduvaria glossopetala is a species of plant in the family Annonaceae. It is native to the Malay Peninsula. Yvonne Chuan Fang Su and Richard M.K. Saunders, the botanists who first formally described the species, named it after the tongue (Latinized form of Greek γλωσσα-, glossa-) shaped gland on their inner petals (petala, in Latin).

== Description ==
It is a small tree reaching 4 meters (13 ft) in height. Its elliptical, leathery leaves are 15–21 by 4.5–7 centimeters. The leaves have pointed to blunt bases and tapering tips, with the tapering portion 17–21 millimeters long. The leaves are hairless on their upper and lower surfaces. The leaves have 14 pairs of secondary veins emanating from their midribs. Its hairless petioles are 5–9 by 1.5–2.5 millimeters with a narrow groove on their upper side. Its Inflorescences are solitary and are organized on peduncles that are 3 by 0.5 millimeters. Each inflorescence has up to 4 flowers. Each flower is on a hairless pedicel that is 10–15 by 0.3 millimeters. The pedicels are organized on a rachis up to 6 millimeters long that have 3 bracts. The pedicels have a medial, densely hairy bract that is 0.6 millimeters long. The flowers are thought to be unisexual, but neither female flowers nor fruit have not been observed. Its flowers have 3 oval sepals, that are 1.3 by 1.5 millimeters. The sepals are hairless on their upper surface, sparsely hairy on their lower surface, and hairy at their margins. Its 6 petals are arranged in two rows of 3. The pale yellow, egg-shaped, outer petals are 6.5 by 3–5 millimeters with slightly hairy upper and lower surfaces. The inner petals are pale yellow with dark red highlights. The diamond-shaped, inner petals have a 4.5 millimeter long claw at their base and a 7 by 3 millimeter blade. The inner petals have pointed bases and tips. The upper surfaces of the inner petals are densely hairy and very densely hairy on their lower surfaces. The inner petals have a solitary, tongue-shaped gland on their upper surface. Male flowers have up to 33 stamens that are 1.5 by 2.3 millimeters.

=== Reproductive biology ===
The pollen of P. glossopetala is shed as permanent tetrads.

== Habitat and distribution ==
It has been observed growing in limestone soil types in forests at elevations of 150–460 meters (490–1,510 ft).
