= Melicope jugosa =

Conservation status
- Vulnerable (IUCN 3.1)

Scientific classification
- Kingdom: Plantae
- Clade: Tracheophytes
- Clade: Angiosperms
- Clade: Eudicots
- Clade: Rosids
- Order: Sapindales
- Family: Rutaceae
- Genus: Melicope
- Species: M. jugosa

Binomial name
- Melicope jugosa Hartley, 1994

Species of flowering plant

Melicope jugosa is a species of plant in the family Rutaceae. It is endemic to Borneo, where it is found only on Mount Kinabalu and Mount Tambuyukon in Sabah. It is known from only two locations, and has an estimated area of occupancy (AOO) of 20 km^{2}, and an extent of occurrence (EOO) of 78.379 km^{2}.

It grows in montane rain forests from 1,800 to 2,450 metres elevation, and grows primarily in wet tropical biomes. It has been discovered on sedimentary and ultramafic igneous rocks.

Both subpopulations are protected within Kinabalu Park, and the species' range and population, while small, are not in decline. The species' conservation status is assessed as Vulnerable.

== Taxonomy ==
M. jugosa was identified by T. G. Hartley in 1994, together with two other Borneo-endemic species, M. clemensiae and M. sororia, and given the epithet based on Latin jugosus ("of the mountains"), referring to its habitat.

== Description ==
M. jugosa was described by Hartley to be very closely resembling M. sororia, with distinguishing features include its glabrous terminal bud, shorter petiolules, and larger petals and anthers. It grows as shrubs 1.8–3 m high, and features simple trichomes. Its leaves are patterned as opposite tri- and/or unifoliolates, 5.5–16.5 m in length. Its inflorescences are axillary, glabrous or with sparsely puberulent pedicles, consisting of few or many flowers. Petals are yellowish green. The fruiting carpels are glabrous throughout with length of around 10 mm, with its seeds being ellipsoid and slightly immature, and about 8 mm long.
