= Marsypopetalum triste =

Scientific classification
- Kingdom: Plantae
- Clade: Tracheophytes
- Clade: Angiosperms
- Clade: Magnoliids
- Order: Magnoliales
- Family: Annonaceae
- Genus: Marsypopetalum
- Species: M. triste

Binomial name
- Marsypopetalum triste (Pierre) B.Xue & R.M.K.Saunders

Synonyms
- Polyalthia littoralis subsp. tristis (Pierre) Bân; Polyalthia tristis (Pierre) Finet & Gagnep.; Unona tristis Pierre

Species of flowering plant

Marsypopetalum triste is a species of plants in the custard apple family Annonaceae native to Vietnam.
