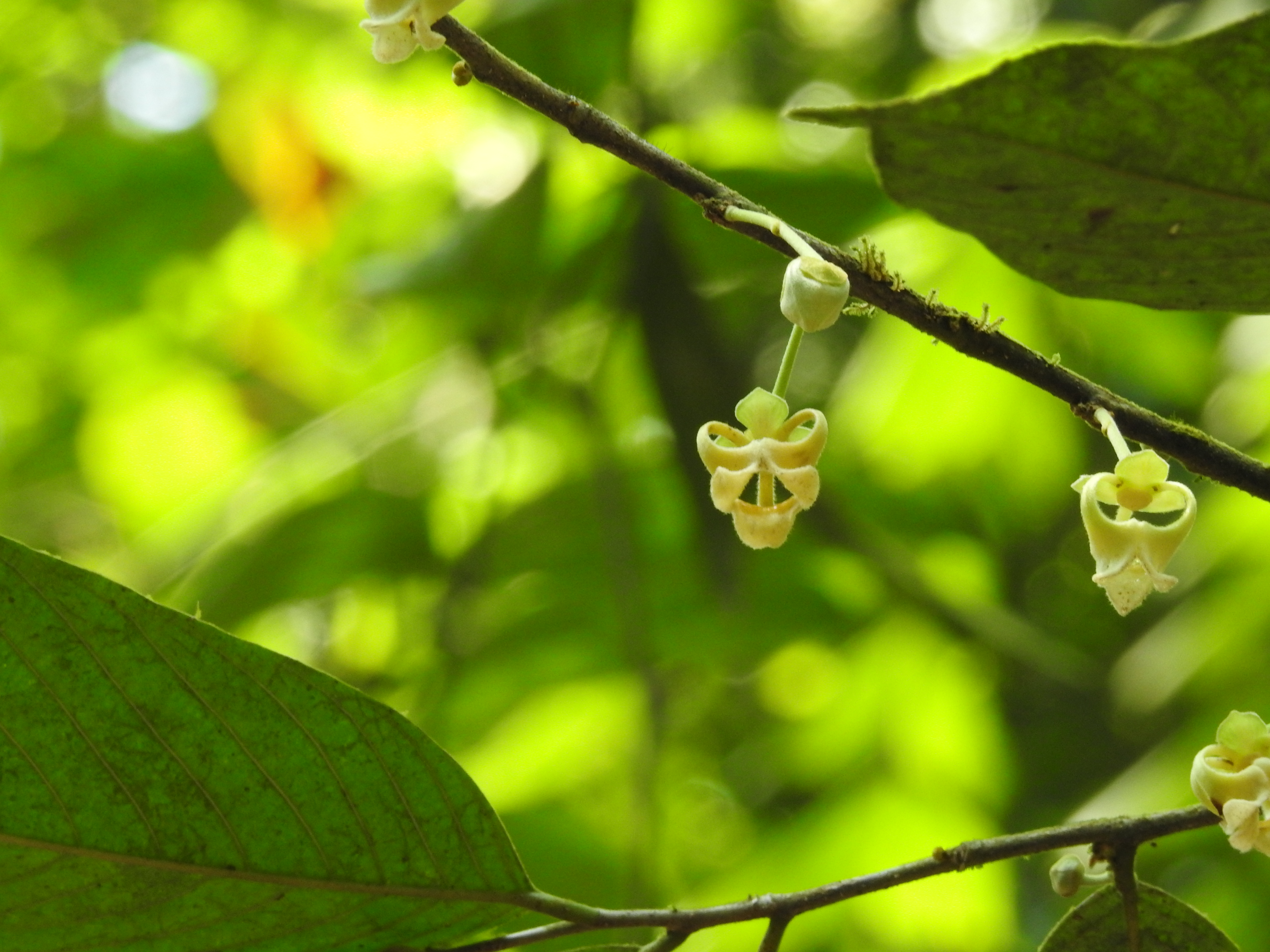
- Marsypopetalum modestum

Scientific classification
- Kingdom: Plantae
- Clade: Tracheophytes
- Clade: Angiosperms
- Clade: Magnoliids
- Order: Magnoliales
- Family: Annonaceae
- Tribe: Miliuseae
- Genus: Marsypopetalum; Scheff.

Type species
- Marsypopetalum pallidum (Blume) Backer

= Marsypopetalum =

Genus of flowering plants

Marsypopetalum is an Asian plant genus in the family Annonaceae and tribe Miliuseae. Its recorded range is: Andaman Is., Borneo, Cambodia, Hainan, Java, Laos, Lesser Sunda Is., Malaya, Myanmar, Nicobar Is., Philippines, Thailand and Vietnam.

== Species ==
As of January 2025, Plants of the World Online accepts the following 5 species:

1. Marsypopetalum littorale (Blume) B.Xue & R.M.K.Saunders – China, Indochina, western Malesia
2. Marsypopetalum lucidum (Merr.) B.Xue & R.M.K.Saunders – Philippines
3. Marsypopetalum modestum (Pierre) B.Xue & R.M.K.Saunders – Indochina
4. Marsypopetalum pallidum (Blume) Backer – western Malesia
5. Marsypopetalum triste (Pierre) B.Xue & R.M.K.Saunders – Vietnam
