= Pseuduvaria kingiana =

Scientific classification
- Kingdom: Plantae
- Clade: Tracheophytes
- Clade: Angiosperms
- Clade: Magnoliids
- Order: Magnoliales
- Family: Annonaceae
- Genus: Pseuduvaria
- Species: P. kingiana

Binomial name
- Pseuduvaria kingiana Y.C.F.Su & R.M.K.Saunders

Species of plant in the soursop family

Pseuduvaria kingiana is a species of plant in the family Annonaceae. It is native to the Malay Peninsula. Yvonne Chuan Fang Su and Richard Saunders, the botanists who first formally described the species, named it after Sir George King, the British botanist who first collected the species.

== Description ==
It is a tree reaching 9 meters (30 ft) in height. The young, yellow-brown to dark brown branches are densely covered in hairs. Its elliptical, slightly leathery leaves are 18–31.5 by 6–12 centimeters. The leaves have slightly wedge-shaped bases and tapering tips, with the tapering portion 5–18 millimeters long. The leaves are hairless on their upper and lower surfaces. The leaves have 14–22 pairs of secondary veins emanating from their midribs. Its very densely hairy petioles are 3–10 by 2–4 millimeters with a broad groove on their upper side. Its Inflorescences occur alone or in pairs on branches, and are organized on densely hairy peduncles that are 2.5–5 by 0.4–1 millimeters. Each inflorescence has up to 5 flower. Each flower is on a very densely hairy pedicel that is 9–20 by 0.4–0.7 millimeters. The pedicels are organized on a rachis up to 10 millimeters long that have 4–10 bracts. The pedicels have a medial, densely hairy bract that is 0.5–2 millimeters long. Its flowers are unisexual. Its flowers have 3 oval sepals, that are 0.7–1.5 by 1.2 millimeters. The sepals are hairless on their upper surface, densely hairy on their lower surface, and hairy at their margins. Its 6 petals are arranged in two rows of 3. The dark red, oval, outer petals are 1.5–3 by 2–3 millimeters with hairless upper and sparsely hairy lower surfaces. The dark red, heart-shaped inner petals have a 1.5–4 millimeter long claw at their base and a 4.5–7 by 3–5 millimeter blade. The inner petals have slightly heart-shaped bases and pointed tips. The inner petals are sparsely hairy on their upper and lower surfaces. The inner petals have a solitary, diamond-shaped, smooth, slightly raised gland on their upper surface. Male flowers have up to 60–68 stamens that are 0.7–1.1 by 0.5–0.7 millimeters. Female flowers have 7–9 carpels that are 1.4–1.6 by 0.7–0.8 millimeters. Each carpel has 3–5 ovules arranged in two rows. The female flowers have 4–8 sterile stamens. The fruit occur in clusters of 5–7 arranged on densely to sparsely hairy peduncles that are 2–10 by 1–3 millimeters. The individual fruit are attached by densely to slightly hairy pedicles that are 15–25 by 1–2.5 millimeters. The gray-green fruit are globe-shaped and 12–19 by 11–16 millimeters. The fruit are wrinkly, and very densely hairy. Each fruit has up to 3–5 hemispherical to lens-shaped seeds that are 11–12 by 7–10 by 5–7 millimeters, arranged in two rows. The seeds are smooth.

=== Reproductive biology ===
The pollen of P. kingiana is shed as permanent tetrads.

== Habitat and distribution ==
It has been observed growing lowland forests at elevations of 60–600 meters (200–1,970 ft).
