= Marsypopetalum pallidum =

Scientific classification
- Kingdom: Plantae
- Clade: Tracheophytes
- Clade: Angiosperms
- Clade: Magnoliids
- Order: Magnoliales
- Family: Annonaceae
- Genus: Marsypopetalum
- Species: M. pallidum

Binomial name
- Marsypopetalum pallidum (Blume) Backer

Synonyms
- Guatteria pallida Blume; Marsypopetalum ceratosanthes Scheff.; Monoon pallidum (Blume) Miq.; Anaxagorea meyeriana Zoll.

Species of flowering plant

Marsypopetalum pallidum is a species of plants in the custard apple family Annonaceae native to Borneo, Java and Malaya.
