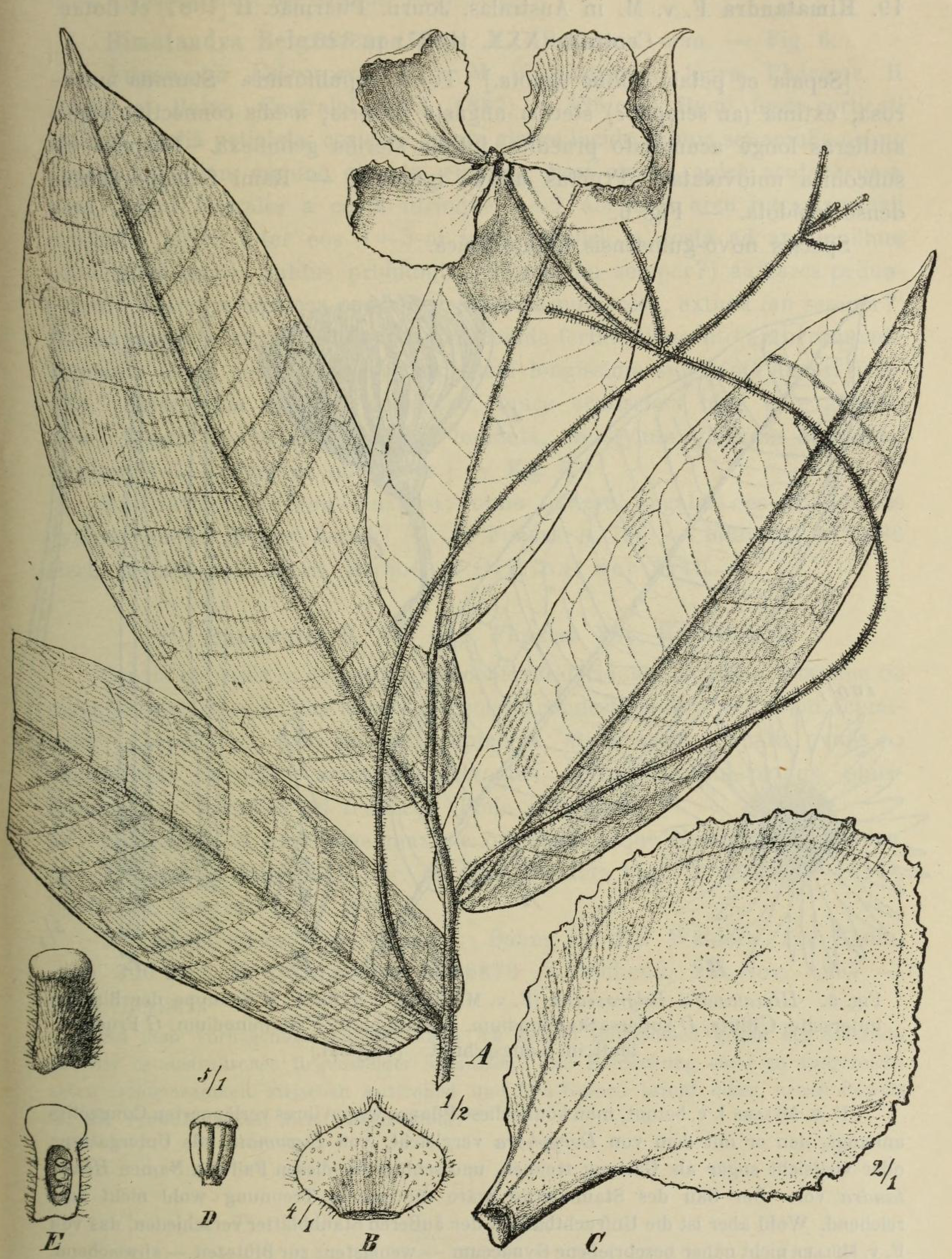
- Botanical illustration of Pseuduvaria megalopus using the synonym Petalolophus megalopus

Scientific classification
- Kingdom: Plantae
- Clade: Tracheophytes
- Clade: Angiosperms
- Clade: Magnoliids
- Order: Magnoliales
- Family: Annonaceae
- Genus: Pseuduvaria
- Species: P. megalopus

Binomial name
- Pseuduvaria megalopus (K.Schum.) Y.C.F.Su & Mols

Synonyms
- Petalolophus megalopus K.Schum.

= Pseuduvaria megalopus =

Species of plant in the soursop family

Pseuduvaria megalopus is a species of plant in the family Annonaceae. It is native to New Guinea. Karl Schumann, the German botanist who first formally described the species using the synonym Petalolophus megalopus, named it after the large (Latinized form of Greek μεγαλος, megalos) wings that extend downwards from the underside of the inner petals to form a foot (Latinized form of Greek πους, pous) of dark red tissue that resembles carrion and is thought to attract fly pollinators.

== Description ==
It is a small tree reaching 4 meters (13 ft) in height. The young, light brown to black branches are densely covered in hairs and also have sparse lenticels. Its elliptical to egg-shaped, leathery leaves are 14–24 cm (5.5–9.4 in) by 4–9 cm (1.6–3.5 in). The leaves have slightly wedge-shaped bases and tapering tips, with the tapering portion 6–30 millimeters long. The leaves are hairless on their upper surfaces and hairless to densely hairy on their lower surfaces. The leaves have 10–18 pairs of secondary veins emanating from their midribs. It lacks petioles. Its Inflorescences are solitary on branches, and are organized on peduncles that are 100–270 by 0.7–1 millimeters. The peduncles are hairless to sparsely hairy. Each inflorescence has up to 5 flowers. Each flower is on a slightly hairy pedicel that is 50–95 by 0.5–1 millimeters. The pedicels are organized on a rachis up to 5 millimeters long that have 2–5 bracts. The pedicels have a medial, very densely hairy bract that is 0.5–1.5 millimeters long. Its flowers are male or hermaphroditic. Its flowers have 3 free, oval sepals, that are 0.7–1.5 by 2 millimeters. The sepals are hairless on their upper surface, densely hairy on their lower surface, and hairy at their margins. Its 6 petals are arranged in two rows of 3. The purple, oval, outer petals are 2.5–5.5 by 3.5–7 millimeters with hairless upper and densely hairy lower surfaces. The purple, egg-shaped, inner petals have a 2–3 millimeter long claw at their base and a 6.5 by 8 millimeter blade. The inner petals have bases that end abruptly and pointed tips with a rounded end. The inner petals are sparsely hairy on their upper and lower surfaces. The inner petals have deep-red, undulating, wing-like projections that are 30–70 by 20–45 millimeters extending from their undersides. Male flowers have up to 90 stamens that are 1 by 0.8 millimeters. Hermaphroditic flowers have up to 60 stamens that are 1 by 0.8 millimeters and up to 15 carpels that are 2–2.8 by 1.5–2 millimeters. Each carpel has up to 6 ovules arranged in two rows. The fruit occur in clusters of 3–6 and are organized on slightly hairy peduncles that are 120–250 by 1–2 millimeters. Each fruit is on a slightly hairy pedicles that is 60–155 millimeters. The orange, fruit are globe-shaped and 18–26 by 15–24 millimeters. The fruit are smooth, and hairless to densely hairy. Each fruit has up to 4 hemispherical to lens-shaped seeds that are 9–10 by 8–9 by 4–6 millimeters. The seeds are wrinkly.

=== Reproductive biology ===
The pollen of P. megalopus is shed as permanent tetrads. The large, dark red, wing-like appendages extending from the underside of the inner petals resemble decaying meat and are thought to attract large fly species that have been observed to visit the flowers and act as pollinators

== Habitat and distribution ==
It has been observed growing in lowland forests at elevations of 70–550 meters (230–1,800 ft).
