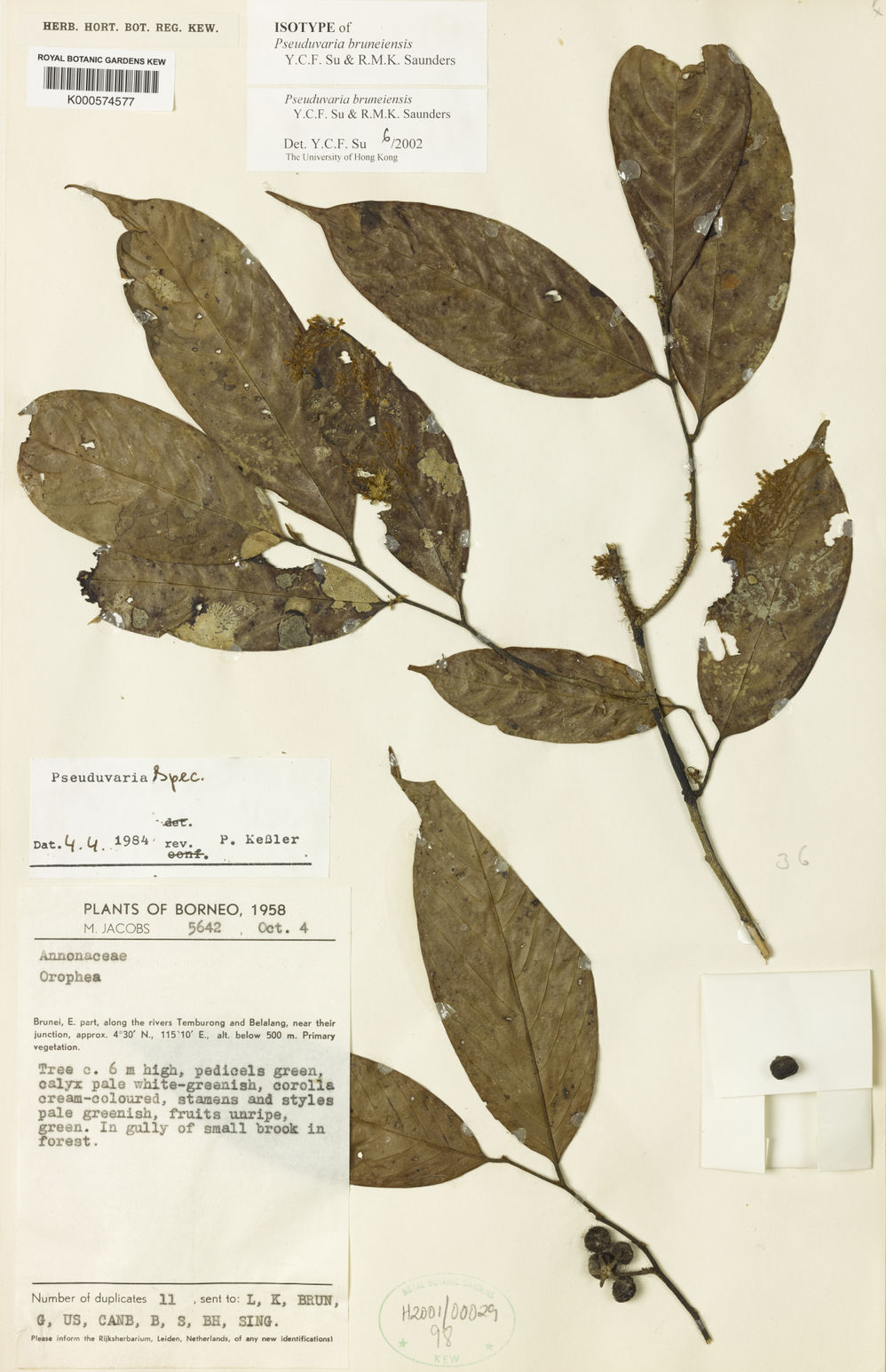
- Herbarium specimen of Pseuduvaria bruneiensis.

Conservation status
- Least Concern (IUCN 3.1)

Scientific classification
- Kingdom: Plantae
- Clade: Tracheophytes
- Clade: Angiosperms
- Clade: Magnoliids
- Order: Magnoliales
- Family: Annonaceae
- Genus: Pseuduvaria
- Species: P. bruneiensis

Binomial name
- Pseuduvaria bruneiensis Y.C.F.Su & R.M.K.Saunders

= Pseuduvaria bruneiensis =

Species of plant in the soursop family

Pseuduvaria bruneiensis is a species of flowering plant in the family Annonaceae. It is a tree endemic to Borneo. Yvonne Chuan Fang Su and Richard M.K. Saunders, the botanists who first formally described the species, named it after Brunei where the specimens they examined were collected.

== Description ==
It is a tree reaching 6 meters (20 ft) in height. Its branches have sparse lenticels. Its papery leaves are 12–18 by 4–6.5 centimeters and come to a point at their tips. The leaves are hairless on their upper and lower surfaces and except for the midrib which is densely hairy on the lower surface. The leaves have 12–16 pairs of secondary veins emanating from their midribs. Its hairy petioles are 5–10 millimeters long with a groove on their upper side. Inflorescences are organized on short, densely hairy peduncles, 1–1.5 millimeters in length. Each inflorescence has up to 6 flowers. Each flower is on a densely hairy pedicel 10–13 millimeters in length. The flowers are unisexual. Its flowers have 3 sepals, 0.8–1 by 0.5 millimeters. The sepals are smooth on their upper surface, hairy on their lower surface, and have fine hairs on their margins. Its 6 petals are arranged in two rows of 3. The outer elliptical petals are 1.5 by 1–1.5 millimeters with smooth upper surfaces and densely hairy lower surfaces. The outer petals are cream-colored. The inner petals have a 0.7–1.2 millimeter long claw at their base and a 2–2.5 by 2–2.5 millimeter blade. The cream-colored inner petals are smooth on their upper surface and densely hairy on their lower surface. Each inner petal has a crown-shaped gland at the base of its outer surface. Male flowers have up to 29 stamens that are 0.6 millimeters long. Female flowers have up to 7 carpels per flower and 2 ovules per carpel. Fruit are on pedicels 12–17 millimeters in length. The fruit consists of up to 3–6 monocarps. Each mature monocarp is a 6–8 by 6–8 millimeter globe. The mature monocarps have a distinctive equatorial ridge. The mature monocarps are green, have an irregular surface and are hairy. Each monocarp has around 2 seeds. The wrinkly, elliptical seeds are 7–7.5 by 6–6.5 millimeters.

=== Reproductive biology ===
The pollen of P. bruneiensis is shed as permanent tetrads.
