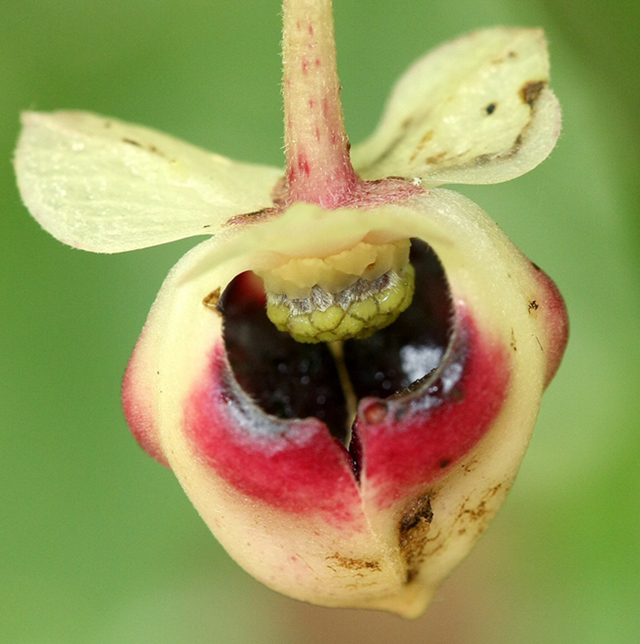
- Flower

Conservation status
- Least Concern (NCA)

Scientific classification
- Kingdom: Plantae
- Clade: Tracheophytes
- Clade: Angiosperms
- Clade: Magnoliids
- Order: Magnoliales
- Family: Annonaceae
- Genus: Pseuduvaria
- Species: P. mulgraveana

Binomial name
- Pseuduvaria mulgraveana Jessup

= Pseuduvaria mulgraveana =

Species of plant in the soursop family

Pseuduvaria mulgraveana is a species of plant in the family Annonaceae endemic to Queensland, Australia. L.W. Jessup, the botanist who first formally described the species, named it after the Mulgrave River, where the specimen he examined was collected.

== Description ==
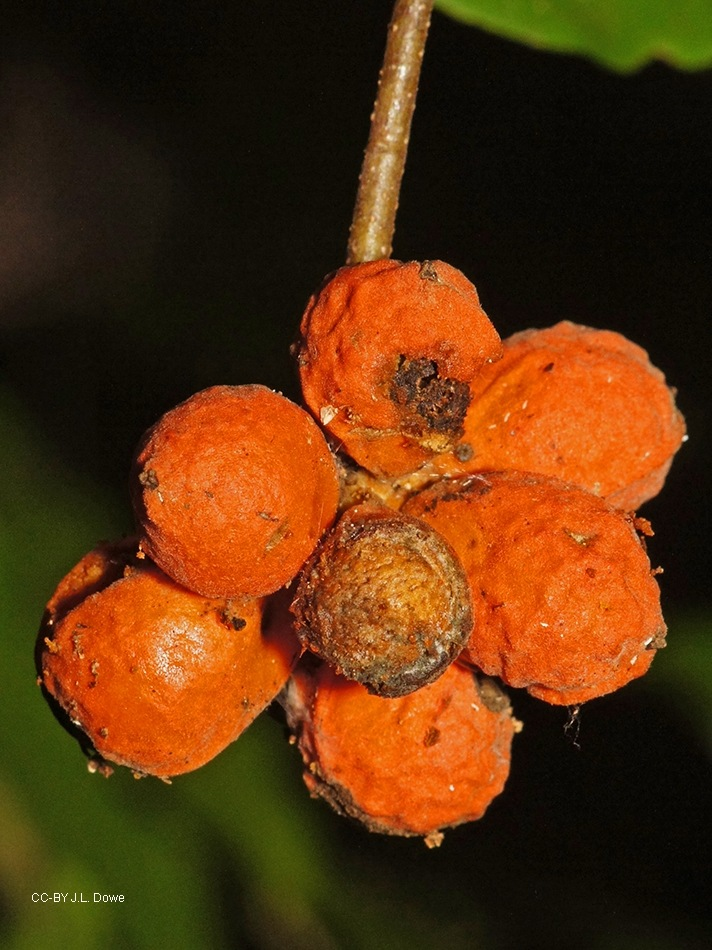
Fruit

It is a small tree reaching up to 7 m (23 ft) in height. The young, light yellow to dark brown branches are densely hairy but become hairless as the branches mature. The branches also have sparse lenticels. Its elliptical, membranous to papery leaves are 9–17 cm (3.5–6.7 in) by 4–8.5 cm (1.6–3.3 in). The leaves have rounded to flat bases and tapering tips, with the tapering portion 5–18 mm long. The leaves are hairless on their upper surfaces and slightly hairy on their lower surfaces. They have 8–12 pairs of secondary veins emanating from their midribs. The densely hairy petioles are 2–5 by 0.8–2.5 mm with a broad groove on their upper side.

The solitary inflorescences occur on branches, and are organized on indistinct peduncles. Each inflorescence has a solitary flower held on a sparsely to very densely hairy pedicel that is 20–45 by 0.3–0.8 mm. The pedicels are organized on a rachis up to 5 mm long that has 2 bracts. The pedicels have a medial, very densely hairy bract that is 0.7–1.2 mm long. Its flowers are male or hermaphroditic and have 3 triangular sepals, that are 1.5–3 by 1–2 mm. The sepals are hairless on their upper surface, sparsely to densely hairy on their lower surface, and hairy at their margins. Its 6 petals are arranged in two rows of 3. The white to light purple, egg-shaped, outer petals are 4.5–8.5 by 4.5–7 mm with hairless upper and sparsely hairy lower surfaces. The white to light purple, diamond-shaped inner petals have a 1.5–5 mm long claw at their base and a 6.5–15 by 6–10.5 mm blade. The inner petals have flat to pointed bases and pointed to sharply pointed tips. The inner petals are hairless on their upper surfaces, except at the margins near the tip, and sparsely to densely hairy on their lower surfaces. The inner petals have two, elliptical, smooth, prominently raised glands on their upper surface. Male flowers have 105–115 stamens that are 0.8–1 by 1–2.2 mm. Hermaphroditic flowers have 28–30 carpels that are 1–2.2 by 0.5–0.7 mm. Each carpel has 2 ovules arranged in a row. The hermaphroditic flowers also have up to 10 stamens.

The fruit occur in clusters of up to 10 on slightly hairy pedicels that are 32–45 by 1–2 mm. The orange, oval to globe-shaped fruit are 10–13 by 6–13 mm. The fruit are smooth, and very densely hairy. Each fruit has up to 2 spherical, wrinkly seeds that are 8–9.5 by 8.5–10 by 5.5–7.5 mm.

=== Reproductive biology ===
The pollen of P. mulgraveana is shed as permanent tetrads. Aethina australis beetles have been observed in the field serving as pollinators. P. mulgraveana has both male and hermaphroditic flowers, but the anthers in the latter only mature after the petals have fallen and the pollinators have left, rendering them effectively monoicous.

== Taxonomy ==
This species was first described by the Australian botanist Laurence W. Jessup in his paper "The Genus Pseuduvaria Miq. (Annonaceae) in Australia", published in 1987. Prior to this, the species had been misidentified as Mitrephora froggattii (now Pseuduvaria froggattii). Two varieties are recognised in Australia: P. mulgraveana var. mulgraveana and P. mulgraveana var. glabrescens, however Plants of the World Online accepts the latter as a distinct species, Pseuduvaria glabrescens.

== Distribution and habitat ==
Pseuduvaria mulgraveana grows as an understorey tree in well developed rainforest. The variety mulgraveana occurs near the bases of Queensland's two highest mountains, Mount Bartle Frere and Mount Bellenden Ker, at altitudes from near sea level up to about 100 m (330 ft). The variety glabrescens occurs further north, from the Mulgrave River to the Mowbray River near Port Douglas, at altitudes up to 800 m (2,600 ft).

== Conservation ==
This species has been assessed under the Queensland Government's Nature Conservation Act as being of least concern. As of 19 May 2024, it has not been assessed by the International Union for Conservation of Nature.

== Uses ==
Oils extracted from its leaves contain high levels of elemicin.
