= Yvonne Chuan Fang Su =

Evolutionary biologist

- Education: University of Hong Kong
- Scientific career
- Fields: Botany, Evolutionary biology
- Workplaces: Duke–NUS Medical School
- Doctoral advisor: R. M. K. Saunders
- Author abbrev. (botany): Y.C.F.Su

Yvonne Chuan Fang Su is a Hong Kong evolutionary biologist who is notable for her co-discovery of Pseuduvaria bruneiensis and Pseuduvaria borneensis. Her doctoral work at the University of Hong Kong focused on the phylogeny of the flowering plant genus Pseuduvaria. Her work as a faculty member at Duke–NUS Medical School focuses on the evolution of viruses.

== Legacy ==
She is an authority for the following taxa:

- Pseuduvaria bruneiensis
- Pseuduvaria borneensis
- Pseuduvaria clemensiae
- Pseuduvaria coriacea
- Pseuduvaria cymosa
- Pseuduvaria fragrans
- Pseuduvaria glabrescens
- Pseuduvaria glossopetala
- Pseuduvaria kingiana
- Pseuduvaria luzoniensis
- Pseuduvaria macrocarpa
- Pseuduvaria megalopus
- Pseuduvaria mindorensis
- Pseuduvaria obliqua
