= Simon Jan van Ooststroom =

Dutch botanist (1906–1982)

- Born: 2 January 1906; Rotterdam, Netherlands
- Died: 28 September 1982 (aged 76); Oegstgeest, Netherlands
- Education: Utrecht University
- Known for: Research on Convolvulaceae; co-editor of Flora Neerlandica
- Scientific career
- Fields: Botany, plant taxonomy

Simon Jan van Ooststroom (2 January 1906 in Rotterdam – 28 September 1982 in Oegstgeest) was a Dutch botanist.

== Life ==
From 1927 to 1934 Ooststroom was a research assistant of the Botanical Museum and the Herbarium in Utrecht. He was awarded his doctorate from Utrecht University in 1934. Subsequently he was first an employee and later curator of the Rijksherbarium in Leiden, now merged into the National Herbarium of the Netherlands. He retired in February 1971.

From several field trips through Europe he collected a large variety of plants. Oostroom was the author of several publications on taxonomy, mainly on Convolvulaceae, and was from 1948 to 1975 co-editor of Flora Neerlandica. He was regional adviser for the Netherlands on the Flora Europaea project.

== Works ==
- Ooststroom, Simon Jan van (1934). A monograph of the genus Evolvulus. Utrecht.
- The Convolvulaceae of New Guinea. 1955.
- Additional Notes on the Convolvulaceae of New Guinea. 1948.

== Sources and links ==
- Ooststroom on the Website of the Nationaalherbarium
- Robert Zander (1984), Fritz Encke; Günther Buchheim; Siegmund Seybold (eds.), Handwörterbuch der Pflanzennamen (in German) (13. ed.), Stuttgart: Ulmer Verlag, ISBN 3-8001-5042-5
- biographical note and pictures of van Ooststroom
