= Melicope clemensiae =

Conservation status
- Least Concern (IUCN 3.1)

Scientific classification
- Kingdom: Plantae
- Clade: Tracheophytes
- Clade: Angiosperms
- Clade: Eudicots
- Clade: Rosids
- Order: Sapindales
- Family: Rutaceae
- Genus: Melicope
- Species: M. clemensiae

Binomial name
- Melicope clemensiae T.G.Hartley

Species of plant

Melicope clemensiae is a plant in the family Rutaceae. It is native to Borneo.

== Description ==
Melicope clemensiae grows as a shrub or tree up to 12 m (40 ft) tall. The glabrous leaves are olanceolate or obovate to elliptic and measure up to 16 cm (6 in) long. The inflorescences are axillary and feature many small unisexual flowers with white to cream-coloured petals. The glabrous quality of the leaves is the main differentiation of this species with respect to Melicope subunifoliolata.

== Taxonomy ==
Melicope clemensiae was described in 1994 by the American botanist Thomas Gordon Hartley. The type specimen was collected in Kinabalu Park on Borneo. The species is named for the American botanist Mary Strong Clemens.

== Distribution and habitat ==
Melicope clemensiae is endemic to Borneo, where it is currently known only from Sarawak and Sabah. Its habitat is mostly in primary forests, situated in hilly areas, at elevations of 650–1,800 m (2,000–6,000 ft). The species also occurs near rivers.

== Conservation ==
Melicope clemensiae has been assessed as least concern on the IUCN Red List. Although so far found in a limited number of areas, the species is likely to occur more widely and is not considered threatened. It is not known to be traded or locally used. Melicope clemensiae is present in protected areas including Kinabalu Park and Sosopodon Forest Reserve.
