= Joseph Clemens =

American chaplain, missionary, plant collector & botanist (1862–1936)

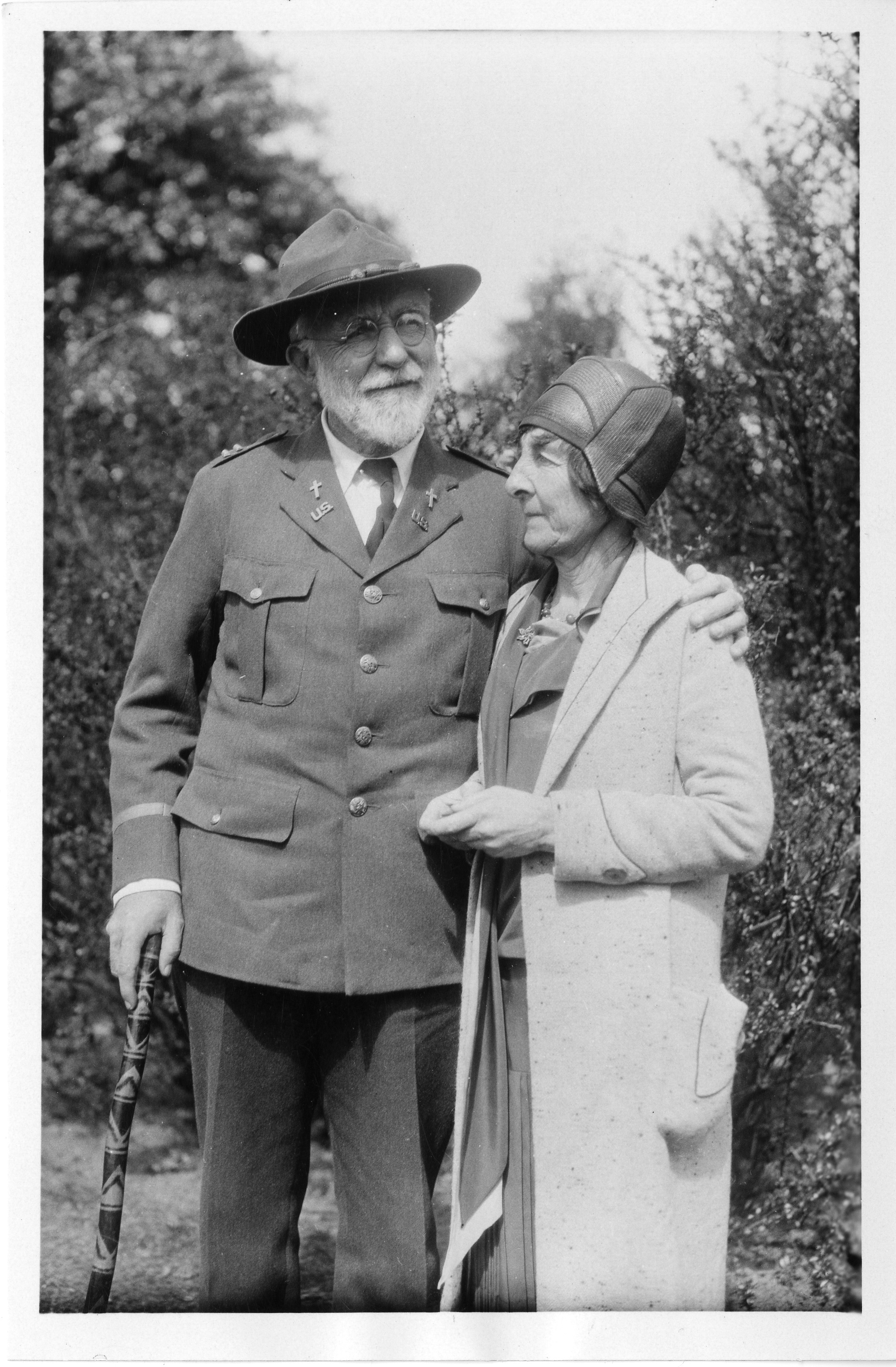
Joseph and Mary Clemens.

Joseph Clemens (December 9, 1862 – January 21, 1936) was an American Methodist Episcopalian chaplain, missionary and plant collector who served and worked in South East Asia and elsewhere. He was born in the rugged western English county of Cornwall. Later, his family migrated to Williamsport, Pennsylvania, and then moved to Eichelsburg, Pennsylvania. His father was a Cornish iron miner, Charles Clemens, and his mother, Mary Jane James Clemens. Joseph was the only one of five brothers who did not follow the family tradition and become a miner. He also had a sister.

== Education ==
In 1890, at the age of 28, he entered Dickinson College in Carlisle, Pennsylvania after probable preparation at the Williamsport Seminary, which was a secondary school and a source of Dickinson students at the time. While at Dickinson, Joseph took the basic courses and studied to be a missionary. Among his courses of study were Dutch, German, Greek, Latin, and Hebrew, as well as Physics, Chemistry, Analytical Geometry, Political Economics, English Literature and Psychology. While at Dickinson, he was a member of the Sigma-Phi chapter of Sigma Alpha Epsilon, and he wrote one of the yearly histories for the fraternity. He was the treasurer for the Union Philosophical Society and exhibited his religious zeal by being the treasurer of the Dickinson Prohibition Club. He played in the College orchestra and sang in the College choir. He was also a member of the Democratic committee at the college YMCA and the class poet.

Pointing to his eventual missionary status, he was a member of the Missionary department at the College YMCA and the corresponding secretary of the Williamsport Seminary Club. While at Dickinson, he passed most of his time with his involvement in his many activities. He also played checkers, wrote letters to friends, acquaintances, family, church, and to his fiancée, Mary Knapp Strong of Muncy County, and studied. Many of his weekends were spent traveling to Williamsport to spend time with Strong.

== Missionary work ==
After graduation, from 1894–1901 Clemens was a pastor for the Central Pennsylvania Methodist Episcopal Conference. In 1896 he married Mary Knapp Strong. In 1901 he decided to serve his country and became a chaplain in the United States Army. After his commissioning, he was sent almost directly to Hawaii with the Fifteenth Infantry.

From Hawaii, he was moved to the new American possession of the Philippines, recently obtained from Spain in the Spanish–American War. One of his tasks was to bring "civilization" to the local population through missionary service. During one of his first services, on April 13, 1902, more than a hundred locals attended. After that, he held weekly services. The numbers interested fluctuated; on April 20, for example, there were only 50 in attendance, though the following week the number went back up to 75. Also, in 1902, while in Samar, he helped to wipe out a cholera epidemic threatening all there. In 1905, the Clemens' made the voyage to Mindanao, where he continued his missionary practice and also began a botanical study with guidance from his wife.

In 1918 he retired from the military due to injury. He spent five months lecturing in Pennsylvania in small towns, factories, schools and churches and with the money he earned, he made an endowment to Dickinson College to support its missions.

The Clemens' returned to the Philippines in 1922. There, he spent six and a half years doing evangelical work in Luzon. During this time, he baptized 16,000 people.

== Botanical collecting ==
In 1915, while living in a mission camp and continuing to preach to the natives, Joseph and Mary made their first study together at Mount Kinabalu in North Borneo. In a period of six weeks they found and documented 101 new species of plants. In July 1931 he and his wife moved onward, leaving Luzon and the Philippines for Borneo again. There they began a plant collecting expedition which was later commissioned by the British Museum.

== Death ==
Clemens died on January 21, 1936, some weeks after his seventy-third birthday, in New Guinea from food poisoning contracted from eating contaminated wild boar meat. The College Alumni Magazine paid tribute in an obituary in May 1936. The couple had never had any children, and Mary spent the rest of her life, from the outbreak of war in the Pacific when she was evacuated from New Guinea, in Australia, most of it working at the Queensland Herbarium. Upon the discovery of his diaries, she donated them to the Dickinson College archives.

== See also ==
- Mary Strong Clemens
