= Richard M.K. Saunders =

Botanist

Richard M. K. Saunders
- Born: 1964 (age 61–62)
- Education: University of Portsmouth (Ph.D.), University of Reading (M.Sc.), University of St Andrews (B.Sc.)
- Scientific career
- Fields: Botany
- Workplaces: The University of Hong Kong
- Author abbrev. (botany): R.M.K.Saunders

Richard M. K. Saunders (born 1964) is a botanist.

== Work ==
Among other subjects, his work has focused on the systematics and evolution of Annonaceae, a family of flowering plants.

== Legacy ==
He is the authority for the following taxa:

- Pseuduvaria bruneiensis

== Published works ==
Saunder's books include:

- Portraits of Trees of Hong Kong and Southern China (Earnshaw Books, 2019) with Sally Bunker and Chun Chiu Pang
